This is a list of programs currently, formerly, and soon to be broadcast on Televisión Española, in Spain.

{| class="wikitable sortable"
|- bgcolor="#ececec" valign=top
! Original title !! Years !! Genre !! Performers / hosts
|-
| +Cotas || 2019 || Science || Macarena Berlín
|-
| 003 y medio || 1979–1980 || Children || Torrebruno
|-
| 10 líneas de 'El Quijote'  || 2005 || Culture || 
|-
| 14 de abril. La República || 2011–2019 || Drama series || Verónica Sánchez and Félix Gómez
|-
| La 2 en el teatro || 1997 || Culture || Juanjo Artero
|-
| La 2 Noticias || 1994–2020 || News || Lorenzo Milá, Fran Llorente, Beatriz Ariño,Cristina Villanueva, Mara Torres and Paula Sainz-Pardo
|-
| 24 horas || 1970–1973 || News || Manuel Martín Ferrand, Jesús Hermida and José María García
|-
| 24 horas en la calle || 2013 || Docudrama || 
|-
| 24 imágenes por segundo || 1977 || Variety show || Isabel Tenaille
|-
| 3, 2, 1... contacto || 1982–1983/1990–1991 || Children || Sonia Martínez
|-
| 30 grados a la sombra || 1964 || Sitcom || Antonio Garisa
|-
| 300 millones || 1977–1983 || Variety show || Pepe Domingo Castaño
|-
| 35 millones de españoles || 1975 || Variety show || José Antonio Plaza and Alfredo Amestoy
|-
| 360 grados en torno a... || 1972 || Music || Valerio Lazarov
|-
| 3x4 || 1988–1990 || Game show || Julia Otero, Isabel Gemio and Jordi González
|-
| 48 horas || 1987–1989 || News || Pedro Erquicia, Andrés Aberasturi and Antonio San José
|-
| 59 segundos || 2004–2012 || Talk show || Mamen Mendizábal, Ana Pastor and María Casado
|-
| 625 Lineas || 1976–1981 || Variety show || José Antonio Plaza, Mayra Gómez Kemp and Marisa Medina
|-
| 7 cantos de España || 1977 || Science|| 
|-
| 80 cm || 2015– || Documentary || Edu Soto and Juan José Ballesta
|-
| 9 de cada 10 || 2008 || Game show || Toni Clapès
|-
| A debate || 1991 || Talk show|| Josep María Balcells
|-
| A Electra le sienta bien el luto || 1986 || Theatre || María del Puy and Manuel Galiana
|-
| A fondo || 1976–1981 || Interviews || Joaquín Soler Serrano
|-
| A la caza del tesoro || 1984 || Game show || Miguel de la Quadra-Salcedo and Isabel Tenaille
|-
| A las diez en casa || 1995 || Game show|| Elisenda Roca
|-
| A las diez en mi barrio|| 1956 || Sitcom || José Luis Ozores
|-
| A las ocho con Raffaella || 1993–1994 || Game show|| Raffaella Carrà
|-
| A las once en casa || 1998–1999 || Sitcom|| Antonio Resines, Carmen Maura and Ana Obregón
|-
| A media tarde || 1985–1988 || Children || Enrique Simón
|-
| A media voz || 1964 || Music || María del Carmen Goñi
|-
| A media voz || 1987–1989 || Music || Rosa León and Óscar Ladoire
|-
| A mi manera || 1989–1990 || Variety show || Jesús Hermida and María Teresa Campos
|-
| A partir de hoy || 2019–2020 || Variety show || Máximo Huerta
|-
| A pie de página || 1991–1992 || Science || Salvador Valdés
|-
| A pie, en bici o en moto || 1982 || Science || Victoria Abril
|-
| A simple vista || 1975 || Culture || Leo Anchóriz
|-
| A su aire || 1974 || Music ||
|-
| A su servicio || 1993 || Sitcom || Pilar Bardem
|-
| A toda plana || 1965–1967 || Documentary || Jesús Álvarez, Tico Medina and Miguel de la Quadra-Salcedo
|-
| A todo ritmo || 1971–1972 || Music || Pepe Domingo Castaño
|-
| A tope || 1987–1988 || Music || Eva Mosquera
|-
| A través de la tiniebla || 1971 || Drama series || José Luis Pellicena
|-
| A través del espejo || 1988–1990 || Science || Cristina García Ramos
|-
| A vista de pájaro || 1986 || Documentary ||
|-
| Abierto por vacaciones || 1993 || Comedy || Cruz y Raya
|-
| Abuela Cleta, La || 1977 || Children || 
|-
| Abuela de verano || 2005 || Sitcom || Rosa María Sardà
|-
| El acabose || 2017 || Comedy || José Mota
|-
| Acacias 38 || 2015– || Soap opera || Sheyla Fariña
|-
|  || 2001 || Sitcom || Lina Morgan
|-
| Acceso autorizado || 2019 || Docu-reality|| Cayetana Guillén Cuervo
|-
| Acompáñame || 1992 || Variety show || Isabel Gemio
|-
| El Actor y sus personajes || 1981|| Culture ||
|-
| Acuda al doctor || 1960 || Sitcom || Carlos Larrañaga
|-
| Adelante el inventor || 1965 || Game show || Enrique Rubio
|-
| Adivina quién miente esta noche || 1994 || Game show || Elena Markínez
|-
| Adivine su vida || 1960 || Game show || Federico Gallo
|-
| Aeropuerto Telefunken || 1958–1959 || Variety show || Mariano Ozores and Blanca Álvarez
|-
| Agenda informativa || 1986–1989 || News || Joaquín Arozamena
|-
| Agente 700 || 2001 || Comedy || Josema Yuste
|-
| Agrosfera || 1997- || News || Lourdes Zuriaga, María San Juan and Sandra Sutherland
|-
| Águila Roja || 2009–2016 || Drama series || David Janer
|-
| Ahora o nunca || 1992 || Game show || Ramón García
|-
| Ahí te quiero ver || 1984–1987 || Variety show || Rosa María Sardà
|-
| Al compás de las estrellas || 1971 || Sports || Raúl Matas
|-
| Al filo de la Ley || 2005 || Drama series || Leonardo Sbaraglia
|-
| Al filo de lo imposible || 1970 || Drama series || Antonio Ferrandis, Agustín González, Juanjo Menéndez
|-
| Al filo de lo imposible || 1982- || Documentary || Sebastián Álvaro
|-
| Al galope || 1984–1986 || Sports || Daniel Vindel and Marisa Abad
|-
| Al habla || 1998–2004 || News || Susana Hernández
|-
| Al mil por mil || 1983–1986 || Sports || Javier Vázquez
|-
| ¡Ala... Dina! || 2000–2002 || Sitcom || Paz Padilla and Miriam Díaz Aroca
|-
| Alaska y Coronas || 2014 || Talk show || Alaska
|-
| Alaska y Segura || 2015 || Talk show || Alaska and Santiago Segura
|-
| Alcores || 1981–1983 || Science || Manuel Toharia
|-
| Alquibla || 1988 || Science ||
|-
| Al punto || 2015 || Cooking show || Elena Sánchez
|-
| La Alfombra Roja Palas || 2015 || Variety show || Berta Collado
|-
| Amar en tiempos revueltos || 2005–2012 || Soap opera || Ana Otero
|-
| Amigas y conocidas || 2014–2018 || Talk show || Inés Ballester
|-
| Amigos del martes || 1961–1964 || Variety show || Franz Johan and Gustavo Re
|-
| Ana y los siete || 2002–2005 || Sitcom || Ana Obregón
|-
| Ana Tramel. El juego || 2021 || Drama || Maribel Verdú and Natalia Verbeke
|-
| Analía Gadé nos cuenta || 1961–1962 || Variety show || Analía Gadé
|-
| Andante || 1977 || Music || Marisa Medina
|-
| Angelino Pastor || 1967 || Sitcom || Juanjo Menéndez
|-
| Anillos de oro || 1983 || Drama series || Ana Diosdado and Imanol Arias
|-
| Animales racionales || 1972–1973 || Sitcom || Antonio Casal and Manolo Gómez Bur
|-
| Animalia || 1970 || Science || Félix Rodríguez de la Fuente
|-
| Ankawa || 2005–2006 || Game show || Bertín Osborne
|-
| Antena infantil || 1965–1971 || Children || María del Carmen Goñi
|-
| Antología de la Zarzuela || 1979 || Music || Fernando García de la Vega
|-
| Los Anuncios de tu vida || 2011|| Videos|| Manuel Campo Vidal
|-
| Los Años vividos || 1992 || Documentary ||
|-
| Apaga la luz || 2007 || Sitcom || Mariví Bilbao, Janfri Topera, Aurora Sánchez and Verónica Mengod
|-
| Aplauso || 1978–1983 || Music || José Luis Fradejas
|-
| Aquí el segundo programa || 1965–1966 || News || Joaquín Soler Serrano
|-
| Aquí España || 1966 || News || Santiago Vázquez and Marisol González
|-
| Aquí hay negocio || 1995 || Sitcom || María Luisa Merlo and Miguel Rellán
|-
| Aquí hay trabajo || 2003- || Variety show || Juan José Pardo and María José Molina
|-
| Aquí jugamos todos || 1995–1996 || Game show || Miriam Díaz Aroca and Ramón García
|-
| Aquí la Tierra || 2014– || Weather || Jacob Petrus
|-
| Aquí y ahora || 1975–1976 || Variety show || José Luis Uribarri
|-
| El árbol de los deseos || 2017 || Docudrama|| Edu Soto
|-
| Arco de triunfo || 1991 || Talent show || Isabel Gemio and José Manuel Parada
|-
 | Arroz y tartana  || 2003 || Drama Series || Carmen Maura and José Sancho.
|-
| El Arte de vivir || 1982–1987 || Science || Victoria Prego
|-
| Arte y artistas || 1965–1966 || Science || Manuel Sánchez Camargo
|-
| Así como suena || 1982–1983 || Interviews || Mari Cruz Soriano
|-
| Así de claro || 2015 || Talk show || Ernesto Sáenz de Buruaga
|-
| Así es la vida || 1999 || Interviews || Carlos Herrera
|-
| Así fue, así lo cuentan || 1987 || Science || Paco Costas
|-
| Así son las cosas || 1997 || News || Manuel Giménez
|-
| Así terminó || 1960 || Sitcom || Mary Carrillo
|-
| ¡Atención obras! || 2013– || Variety show || Cayetana Guillén Cuervo
|-
| Atlantia || 2004 || Science || Manuel Toharia
|-
| Atrévete a soñar || 1998 || Comedy || Julio Sabala
|-
| Auambabuluba balambambú || 1985–1986 || Music || Carlos Tena
|-
| Audacia || 2000–2001 || Game show || Jordi Estadella
|-
| Audiencia abierta || 2012– || News || Ángeles Bravo
|-
| Los Aurones || 1987–1988 || Children ||
|-
| Autores invitados || 1966–1967 || Science ||
|-
| Autorretrato || 1984–1985 || Interviews || Pablo Lizcano
|-
| Aventura || 1969 || Documentary || Miguel de la Quadra-Salcedo
|-
| Aventura 92 || 1989–1991 || Science || Miguel de la Quadra-Salcedo
|-
| La Aventura de la música || 1963–1964 || Music || Adela Cantalapiedra
|-
| La Aventura del saber || 1992- || Science || María San Juan and Salvador Valdés
|-
| La Aventura humana || 1985 || Science || Alberto Oliveras
|-
| Las Aventuras del Hada Rebeca || 1976 || Children || Conchita Goyanes
|-
| Aventuras y desventuras de Mateo || 1972 || Sitcom|| Jesús Puente
|-
| Ay Lola, Lolita, Lola || 1995 || Variety show|| Lola Flores and Lolita Flores
|-
| Ay, vida mía || 1992–1993 || Variety show|| Mary Carmen
|-
| Ayer domingo || 1965–1971 || Sports || Matías Prats Cañete and Miguel Ors
|-
| Ayer noticia, hoy dinero || 1961 || Game show || Mario Beut
|-
| Ayer, hoy y mañana || 1968 || News || Enrique Rubio
|-
| La azotea de Wyoming || 2005 || Late night || El Gran Wyoming
|-
| Bailando con las estrellas || 2018 || Talent Show|| Roberto Leal
|-
| El Baile || 1985 || Theatre || Marisa Paredes
|-
| Bailes de salón || 2006 || Music || Javier Castillo, Poty
|-
| Bajo el mismo techo || 1970 || Sitcom || Antonio Ferrandis and Julia Gutiérrez Caba
|-
| Balas de plata || 2008 || Interviews || Lorena Berdún
|-
| Banana Split || 2020 || cooking show || Mikel López Iturriaga
|-
| La Banda de Pérez || 1997 || Sitcom|| Antonio Resines
|-
| Barcelona: Juegos de sociedad || 1992 || Variety show || Inka Martí
|-
| El Barquito de papel || 1963–1964 || Children || Marisa Porcel
|-
| La Barraca || 1979 || Drama eeries || Álvaro de Luna
|-
| Barrio Sésamo || 1979–2000 || Children || Emma Cohen and Chelo Vivares
|-
| Bazar || 1963 || Variety show|| Mario Cabré
|-
| Biblioteca juvenil || 1966–1968 || Children || María Luisa Seco
|-
| Biblioteca Nacional || 1982–1983 || Science || Fernando Sánchez Dragó
|-
| El Bigote de Babel || 1987 || Children ||
|-
| Biografía del ayer || 1964 || Science || Luis Pruneda
|-
| Bit a Bit || 1993–1995 || Science || Luis Miguel Torrecillas and Guillem Caballé
|-
| Bla, bla, bla || 1981–1983 || Society news || Jesús María Amilibia and Marisa Abad
|-
| Blanco y negro || 1981–1982 || Variety show || Mari Cruz Soriano
|-
| El Blog de Cayetana || 2007 || Variety show || Cayetana Guillén Cuervo
|-
| Bloqueados por el muro || 2020 || Game show|| Àngel Llàcer
|-
| Bodega jerezana || 1957 || Variety show || Jesús Álvarez
|-
| La Bola de Cristal || 1984 || Children || Olvido Gara
|-
| La Bolsa y la vida || 1981 || Science || Isabel Tenaille
|-
| El Bosque protector || 2002 || Science ||
|-
| La Botica de la abuela || 1997–2006 || Variety show || Txumari Alfaro
|-
| El Botones sacarino || 2000–2001 || Sitcom || Jorge Roelas
|-
| Bricomanía || 2000–2004 || Science || Kristian Pielhoff
|-
| Brigada Central || 1989–1993 || Drama series|| Imanol Arias
|-
| Buenas noches || 1982–1984 || Interviews || Mercedes Milá
|-
| Buenas noches, amigos || 1957 || Variety show || Jesús Álvarez
|-
| Buenas noches, señores || 1972 || Drama series || Julia Gutiérrez Caba
|-
| Las Buenas noticias || 1978 || News || Tico Medina
|-
| Buenas tardes || 1970–1974 || Variety show || Tico Medina, Raúl Matas and Santiago Vázquez
|-
| Buenas tardes con música || 1963 || Music || Torrebruno
|-
| Buenos días || 1986–1990 || News || José Antonio Martínez Soler
|-
| El Burladero || 2000 || Comedy || Josema Yuste
|-
| Búscate la vida || 1986 || Science || Montserrat Roig
|-
| Cachitos de hierro y cromo || 2013– || Music || Virginia Díaz
|-
| Cada mañana || 1991 || Variety show|| Secundino González and María San Juan
|-
| Cada semana una historia || 1963 || Variety show || Federico Gallo and Enrique Rubio
|-
| Café con leche || 1998 || Sitcom || Santiago Ramos
|-
| Caja de ritmos || 1983 || Music || Carlos Tena
|-
| Cajón desastre || 1988–1991 || Children || Miriam Díaz Aroca
|-
| Caliente || 1991 || Variety show || Ana Obregón
|-
| Calle nueva || 1997–2000 || Soap opera || Remedios Cervantes
|-
| Cámara abierta 2.0 || 2007 || Science || Daniel Seseña
|-
| Cambie su suerte || 1974 || Game show || Joaquín Prat and José Luis Pécker
|-
| Cambio de Clase || 2006 || Science || Andrea Guasch
|-
| Camino del récord || 1973–1974 || Sports || Daniel Vindel
|-
| Caminos y canciones || 1967 || Music || Jesús Álvarez
|-
| Los Camioneros || 1973–1974 || Drama series || Sancho Gracia
|-
| Campanadas de Televisión Española || 1962- || News ||
|-
| Campeones || 1963–1964 || Sports || Miguel Ors
|-
| El Campo || 1975–1976 || News || María Luisa Clemente and Eugenio Martín Rubio
|-
| Canciones de la mar || 1967 || Music || Enrique Rubio and Paca Gabaldón
|-
| Canciones de una vida || 1979–1989 || Music || José Luis Barcelona and Aurora Claramunt
|-
| Canciones del desván || 1975–1976 || Music || María del Carmen Goñi
|-
| Canciones infantiles || 1963 || Music || Alberto Closas
|-
| Canciones para su recuerdo || 1962–1963 || Music || Jorge Arandes
|-
| Canción 71 || 1971 || Music || Joaquín Prat and Laura Valenzuela
|-
| Canta! Singstar || 2008 || Music || Carlos Sobera
|-
| Cántame cómo pasó || 2010 || Music || Anne Igartiburu
|-
| Cantando se hace camino || 1977 || Music || Antoñita Moreno
|-
| Cantar y reir || 1974–1976 || Children || Los payasos de la tele
|-
| Cantares || 1978 || Music || Lauren Postigo
|-
| El Canto de un duro|| 1978–1981 || Science || Mari Carmen García Vela
|-
| Cañas y barro || 1978 || Drama series|| Manuel Tejada, José Bódalo and 
|-
|  || 2014 || Adventure|| Quico Taronjí
|-
| Caras nuevas || 1957–1958 || Talent show || Blanca Álvarez and Adriano Rimoldi
|-
| Carlos, rey emperador || 2015–2016 || Drama series || Álvaro Cervantes and Blanca Suárez
|-
| Carmen y familia || 1996 || Sitcom || Beatriz Carvajal
|-
| La Carretera es de todos || 1967 || Science || Enrique Rubio
|-
| El Carro de la farsa || 1981–1983 || Theatre || Rosana Torres
|-
| Carrusel || 1960 || Variety show || Joaquín Soler Serrano and Isabel Bauzá
|-
| Carrusel del domingo || 1970 || Variety show || Manuel Dicenta and José Luis Barcelona
|-
| Carta blanca || 2006 || Interviews || Varios
|-
| Carta de ajuste || 2004 || Variety show || José María Íñigo and Minerva Piquero
|-
| Cartel || 1965 || Bullfighting || Manuel Lozano Sevilla and Matías Prats Cañete
|-
| Cartelera || 1994–2009 || Variety show || José Toledo
|-
| La Casa de los Martínez || 1967–1971 || Sitcom || Carlos Muñoz and Julia Martínez
|-
| La Casa del reloj || 1971–1974 || Children || Miguel Vila, Pedro Meyer and Paula Gardoqui
|-
| La Casa por la ventana || 1989–1990 || Comedy || Alfonso Arús
|-
| El Caso. Crónica de sucesos || 2016 || Drama series || Fernando Guillén Cuervo
|-
| La Caza || 2019– || Drama series || Megan Montaner
|-
| El Cazador || 2020– || Game show || Ion Aramendi
|-
| El Cazador de cerebros || 2016– || Science || Pere Estupinyà
|-
| La Celestina || 1983 || Drama series || Nuria Torray
|-
| Celia || 1992 || Drama series|| Cristina Cruz Mínguez
|-
| Cena con mamá || 2019 || Talk show || Cayetana Guillén Cuervo
|-
| Centro médico || 2015–2019|| Docudrama ||
|-
| Centros de poder || 1994–1995 || Interviews || Pilar Cernuda and Julia Navarro
|-
| Cerca de las estrellas || 1989 || Sports || Ramón Trecet, José Ángel de la Casa and Jesús Álvarez
|-
| Cerca de ti || 2002–2004 || Talk show || Óscar Martínez
|-
| Las Cerezas || 2004–2005 || Interviews || Julia Otero
|-
| Cervantes || 1981 || Drama series|| Julián Mateos
|-
| La Cesta de la compra || 1986–1987 || Science || Emilio Linder
|-
| Cesta y puntos || 1966–1971 || Game show || Daniel Vindel
|-
| Un Cesto lleno de libros || 1989 || Science || Enrique Simón
|-
| Las Chicas de hoy en día || 1991–1992 || Sitcom || Carmen Conesa and Diana Peñalver
|-
| Las Chicas de oro || 2010 || Sitcom || Concha Velasco, Lola Herrera, Carmen Maura and Alicia Hermida
|-
| Chicas en la ciudad || 1961 || Sitcom || Amparo Baró and Alicia Hermida
|-
| Los Chiripitifláuticos || 1966–1976 || Children || María del Carmen Goñi, Félix Casas and Miguel Armario
|-
| Cifras y Letras || 1991–1996 || Game show || Elisenda Roca
|-
| Cine de barrio || 1995- || Movies || José Manuel Parada, Carmen Sevilla and Concha Velasco
|-
| Circo pop || 1988–1989 || Children || Raquel Vega
|-
| Cita a las siete || 1967 || Interviews || Joaquín Soler Serrano
|-
| Cita con el humor || 1963 || Comedy || Ángel de Andrés, José Luis Coll and Manuel Summers
|-
| Cita con el humor || 1971 || Comedy || Cassen and Franz Johan
|-
| Cita con la música || 1957–1958 || Music || Blanca Álvarez
|-
| Cita con Tony Leblanc || 1969–1970 || Comedy || Tony Leblanc
|-
| Clan familiar || 1968 || Variety show|| Joaquín Soler Serrano and Mario Beut
|-
| Clarín || 1968 || Variety show || Charo Tijero
|-
| Clase media || 1987 || Drama series|| Charo López and Antonio Ferrandis
|-
 | Claves del siglo XXI, Las || 2022 || Economy || Javier Ruiz.
|-
| Clásicos y reverentes || 2017–2018 || Music || 
|-
| La Clave || 1976–1983 || Talk show || José Luis Balbín
|-
| Climas extremos || 2012 || Documentary || Mario Picazo
|-
| Clip, clap, video || 1991–1995 || Music || Tinet Rubira and Guillem Caballé
|-
| Club de fútbol || 2007–2008 || Sports || Josep Pedrerol
|-
| El Club de la comedia || 2003–2004 || Comedy || Emilio Aragón
|-
| Club del martes || 1960–1961 || Variety show|| José Luis Barcelona
|-
| Club del sábado || 1958–1959 || Variety show|| Jesús Álvarez
|-
| Club Disney || 1990–1996 || Children || Juan José Pardo and Luis Miguel Torrecilla
|-
| Club mediodía || 1967–1972 || Variety show || Mario Beut, Marisol González and Bobby Deglané
|-
| Club Miramar || 1959–1960 || Variety show|| Federico Gallo and Mario Cabré
|-
| Cocina || 1957–1958 || Cooking show || Rosita Valero and Adriano Rimoldi
|-
| Cocina al punto con Peña y Tamara || 2020 || Cooking show|| Tamara Falcó
|-
| Cocineros al volante || 2015 || Cooking show|| Paula Prendes
|-
| Cocina con Sergio || 2012–2015 || Cooking show || Sergio Fernández and María José Molina
|-
| La Cocina de Arguiñano || 1995–1998 || Cooking show || Karlos Arguiñano
|-
| Cocina2 || 2014–2015|| Cooking show || Torres Brothers
|-
| Código Emprende || 2013 || Reality show|| Juan Ramón Lucas
|-
| Código uno || 1993–1994 || News || Arturo Pérez-Reverte and Julio César Iglesias
|-
| El Coleccionismo y los coleccionistas || 1979 || Science || Carmen Maura
|-
| Comando actualidad || 2008- || News ||
|-
| La Comedia || 1983–1984 || Theatre ||
|-
| La Comedia dramática española || 1986 || Theatre ||
|-
| La Comedia musical española || 1985 || Music || Fernando García de la Vega
|-
| La Cometa blanca  || 1981–1983 || Children|| Rosa León and Jaime Blanch
|-
| La Cometa naranja|| 1974 || Children || Pedro Meyer and Luis Varela
|-
| Cómicos || 1987 || Culture || 
|-
| Como el perro y el gato || 2007 || Sitcom || Arturo Fernández and Quique Camoiras
|-
| ¿Cómo lo hacen? || 1994 || Game show || Jordi Hurtado and Almudena Ariza
|-
| Como lo ves || 1983–1984|| Children || Enrique Miret and Pilar Pala
|-	
| Como lo ves || 2017 || Talk show || Carlos Herrera
|-	
| Cómo nos reimos || 2012- || Comedy  || 
|-
| Como Pedro por su casa || 1985 || Variety show || Pedro Ruiz
|-
| Como sapiens || 2020-2021 || Cooking show|| Miguel Ángel Muñoz
|-
 | Comodín de La 1, El || 2022-  || Quiz Show|| Aitor Albizu
|-
| Compañera te doy || 1973 || Sitcom|| Carlos Larrañaga and María Luisa Merlo
|-
| Con acento || 1968 || Science|| Manuel Martín Ferrand
|-
| Con dos tacones || 2006 || Sitcom|| Lorena Berdún and Rosario Pardo
|-
| Con las manos en la masa || 1984–1991 || Cooking show|| Elena Santonja
|-
| Con otro acento || 1976–1977 || Science || Miguel de los Santos
|-
| Con todos los acentos || 2005–2009 || News|| Sanaá Harraki
|-
| Con un par... de bromas || 2008 || Comedy|| Javier Capitán
|-
| Con vosotros || 1970–1972 || Children || María Luisa Seco
|-
| Concertino || 1963–1964 || Music || Torrebruno
|-
| El conciertazo || 2000–2009 || Music || Fernando Argenta
|-
| El Conde de Monte Cristo || 1969 || Drama series || Pepe Martín
|-
| El condensador de fluzo || 2021- || Science || Juan Gómez-Jurado and Raquel Martos.
|-
| Confidencias || 1963–1965 || Drama series || Antonio Ferrandis
|-
| Conocemos España || 1978 || Game show|| Mario Beut
|-
| ¿Conoces España? || 2012 || Game show || Ramón García
|-
| Conozca usted España || 1968–1969 || Science || Natalia Figueroa
|-
| Consulte a su médico || 1968 || Science|| Blanca Álvarez and Elisa Montés
|-
| Consultorio || 1961 || Comedy || Álvaro de Laiglesia and Luis Sánchez Polack
|-
| Consumo || 1981–1987 || Science|| Rafael Romero
|-
| Contamos contigo || 1968 || Variety show|| Laura Valenzuela
|-
| Contigo pan y cebolla || 1996–1997 || Sitcom|| Anabel Alonso and Ángel de Andrés López
|-
| Contigo || 1988 || Variety show || Norma Duval
|-
| El Continental || 2018 || Drama series || Michelle Jenner and Alex Garcia
|-
| Contra-reloj || 1972 || Sports || Julio César Fernández
|-
| La Copa || 1963 || Sports || Matías Prats Cañete
|-
| Corazón || 1997- || Society news || Anne Igartiburu
|-
| Corazón || 1989–1990 || Interviews || Fernando García Tola
|-
| Corazón, Corazón || 1993–2010 || Society news || Cristina García Ramos, Jose Toledo and Carolina Casado
|-
| El coro de la cárcel || 2006–2008 || Talent show|| Muntsa Rius
|-
| La Corona mágica || 1989–1990 || Children ||
|-
| Las Cortes de España || 1983–1985 || News || Rosa María Artal and Florencio Solchaga
|-
| Cosas de dos || 1984 || Sitcom || Nicolás Dueñas and Covadonga Cadenas
|-
| Cosas || 1980–1981 || Variety show|| Joaquín Prat, Marisa Abad and Mónica Randall
|-
| Las cosas claras || 2020–2021 || Talk show || Jesús Cintora
|-
| Costa España || 2015 ||Documentary || Mario Picazo
|-
| Cotilleo al aire libre || 1957–1958 || Society news || Jesús Álvarez and Blanca Álvarez
|-
| Cremallera || 1984–1985 || Children || Juanjo Guerenabarrena
|-
| Cristina y los hombres || 1969 || Sitcom || Elena María Tejeiro
|-
| Cristóbal Colón || 1968 || Drama series|| Francisco Rabal
|-
| Crónica joven || 1988 || Children|| Francisco García Novell
|-
| Crónicas || 2004–2006 || News|| Elena Sánchez
|-
| Crónicas de un pueblo || 1971–1974 || Sitcom || Emilio Rodríguez, Fernando Cebrián, Francisco Vidal, Jesús Guzmán
|-
| Crónicas del mal || 1992 || Drama series || Antonio Resines
|-
| Crónicas urbanas || 1990 || Drama series|| Nuria González
|-
| Crush || 2018 || Quiz Show|| Juan Manuel López Iturriaga
|-
| Cruz y raya.com || 2000–2004 || Comedy|| Cruz y Raya
|-
 | Cuaderno de campo || 2022-  || Documentary || Juan Antonio Rodríguez Llano
|-
| ¿Cuál es tu final? || 1966–1967 || Sitcom || Jaime Blanch
|-
| Cuarta dimensión || 1960–1961 || Science || Tico Medina
|-
| Cuarto de estar || 1963 || Sitcom || Valeriano Andrés and Margot Cottens
|-
| Cuarto y mitad || 1976 || Science|| Isabel Bauzá
|-
| Cuatro tiempos || 1974–1975 || Sports|| Paco Costas
|-
| Cuéntame cómo pasó || 2001- || Drama series || Imanol Arias and Ana Duato
|-
| Cuentopos || 1974–1976 || Children|| Tina Sáinz, Juan Diego and Manuel Galiana
|-
| Cuentos imposibles || 1984 || Drama series || Francisco Rabal and Amparo Baró
|-
| Cuentos y leyendas || 1968–1976 || Drama series ||
|-
| Cuestión de tiempo || 2016 || Talk Show || Patricia Gaztañaga
|-
| La Cueva de los cerrojos || 1984 || Drama series||
|-
| Cultura 2 || 1975 || Culture || Elena Escobar and Paloma Chamorro
|-
 | Culturas 2 || 2022- || Culture || Paula Sainz-Pardo.
|-
| Cultural informativo || 1975 || Science || Clara Isabel Francia
|-
| Cumbres || 2014 || Sport|| Edurne Pasabán
|-
| Curro Jiménez || 1976–1978 || Drama series|| Sancho Gracia
|-
| D-Calle || 2006–2007 || Variety show || Cayetana Guillén Cuervo
|-
| The Dancer || 2021 || Talent show || Ion Aramendi
|-
| Danzas de España || 1966 || Music|| Jesús Álvarez
|-
| La Dársena de poniente || 2006 || Drama series || Sancho Gracia
|-
| David el gnomo || 1985 || Children ||
|-
| De 500 a 500.000 || 1962–1963 || Game show|| José Luis Pécker
|-
| De ahora en adelante || 1981–1982 || Music|| Miguel de los Santos
|-
| De carne y hueso || 1991 || Interviews|| Vicky Larraz
|-
| De cerca || 1980–1981 || Interviews|| Jesús Hermida
|-
| De cerca || 2004–2007 || Interviews|| Baltasar Magro
|-
|De jueves a jueves || 1986 || Interviews|| Mercedes Milá
|-
| De la A a la Z || 1972 || Science|| Manuel Criado de Val and Clara Isabel Francia
|-
| De la mano de || 1985 || Variety show ||
|-
| De par en par || 1991–1992 || Variety show|| Javier Vázquez
|-
| ¿De parte de quién? || 1993–1994 || Comedy|| Miguel Gila and Chus Lampreave
|-
| De película || 1982–1991 || Movies || Isabel Mestres and Emilio Linder
|-
| ¿De qué parte estás? || 1994–1995 || Talk show|| José María Íñigo
|-
| De siete en siete || 1985–1987 || Variety show|| Cristina Higueras and Nina Ferrer
|-
| De tal palo || 1992 || Game show || Ramoncín
|-
| De toros || 1989 || Bullfighting|| José María Íñigo
|-
| El Debate de La Primera || 2012–2017 || Talk show|| María Casado and Pilar G. Muñiz
|-
| El Debate de TVE 2 || 2002–2004 || Talk show || Josep Puigbó, Luis Herrero and Alfredo Urdaci
|-
| Debate || 1987 || Talk Show || Victoria Prego
|-
| Decogarden || 2000–2004 || Variety show || Yolanda Alzola
|-
| Del dicho al hecho || 1971 || Sitcom|| Fernando Fernán Gómez
|-
| Del hilo al ovillo || 1965 || News || Federico Gallo and Enrique Rubio
|-
| Del Miño al Bidasoa || 1990 || Science|| Nicolás Dueñas
|-
| Delirios de amor || 1989 || Drama series|| Marisa Paredes
|-
| Dentro de un orden || 1983–1986 || Science|| Cristina García Ramos
|-
| Deporte para todos || 1981 || Sports || Narciso Ibáñez Serrador
|-
| Derecho a discrepar || 1988 || Talk show || Miguel Ángel Gozalo
|-
| Derecho a soñar || 2019 || Drama Series || Alba Ribas
|-
| Desafía tu mente || 2016–2018 || Science || Antonio Lobato
|-
| Desafío 2016 || 2016 || Game Show || Almudena Cid
|-
| Desaparecida || 2007–2008 || Drama series || Carlos Hipólito and Luisa Martín
|-
| Desaparecidos || 2018 || Public Service || Silvia Intxaurrondo
|-
| Los Desastres de la guerra || 1983 || Drama series|| Sancho Gracia
|-
| Los desayunos de TVE || 1994–2020 || Interviews || Julio César Iglesias, Luis Mariñas and Pepa Bueno
|-
| Desde mi butaca || 1956–1957 || Variety show || Jesús Álvarez
|-
| Desde mi butaca || 1970 || Variety show|| Álvaro de la Iglesia
|-
| Destino Argentina || 1978 || Game show || Joaquín Prat
|-
| El Destino en sus manos || 1995 || Variety show || Gemma Nierga
|-
| Destino Plutón || 1980 || Children || Maria Jesús Lleonard and Blanca Martorell
|-
| Destino TV || 1964 || Variety show|| Antolín García
|-
| Destinos de película || 2016 || Movies || Máximo Huerta
|-
| Detrás de la noticia || 1990–1991 || News || José Antonio Martínez Soler
|-
| Detrás del telón || 1968 || Theatre || Fernando Guillén and Gemma Cuervo
|-
| Devórame otra vez || 1991 || Variety show || Guillermo Summers and Susana Hernández
|-
| Día a día || 1963 || Sitcom || Amparo Baró and Mari Carmen Prendes
|-
| Día de fiesta || 1966–1969 || Variety show || Juan Viñas and Herta Frankel
|-
| Un Día es un día || 1990–1993 || Interviews || Àngel Casas
|-
| El Día por delante || 1989–1990 || Variety show || Pepe Navarro
|-
| El Día por delante || 2008 || Variety show || Inés Ballester
|-
| El Día que me quieras || 1995 || Variety show || José María Íñigo
|-
| Diálogos de un matrimonio || 1982 || Sitcom || Jesús Puente and María Luisa San José
|-
| Diana en negro || 1970 || Drama series || José Bódalo
|-
| Diario de sesiones || 1985–1986 || News || María Teresa Campos
|-
| Diario de un ciclista || 2021 || Documentary  || Peio Ruiz Cabestany
|-
| Diario de un nómada || 2015 || Documentary || Miquel Silvestre
|-
 | Diarios de la cuarentena || 2020 || Sitcom|| Petra Martínez
|-
| Días de cine || 1991- || Movies || Antonio Gasset and Cayetana Guillén Cuervo
|-
| Días de verano || 2021 || Variety show || Inés Paz
|-
| Días de vino || 2000–2001 || Science ||
|-
| Diccionario de la salud || 1988–1989 || Science || Ramón Sánchez Ocaña
|-
| Dicho y hecho || 2018 || Comedy|| José Corbacho and Anabel Alonso
|-
| Dichoso mundo || 1966–1967 || Sitcom|| Conchita Montes
|-
| Diego Acevedo || 1966 || Drama series|| Paco Valladares
|-
| Diego Valor || 1958 || Drama series || Ignacio de Paúl
|-
| Las Diez de últimas || 1969–1970 || Game show || José Luis Pecker
|-
| Diez en Ibiza || 2004 || Drama series|| Ángel de Andrés López and Emma Ozores
|-
| Digan lo que digan || 1997–1999 || Talk show || Jaime Bores
|-
| Dime qué fue de ti || 2016 || Variety Show || Teresa Viejo
|-
| Dinamo || 1985–1986 || Children || Marta Barroso
|-
| Ding-Dong || 1980 || Game show || Andrés Pajares and Mayra Gómez Kemp
|-
| Directísimo || 1975–1976 || Variety show|| José María Íñigo
|-
| Directo en la noche || 1986 || Variety show || Jair Pont
|-
| Discorama || 1964–1965 || Music || Pepe Palau and José Luis Barcelona
|-
| Discoteca joven || 1968 || Music || María Luisa Seco
|-
| Divertido siglo || 1972–1973 || Sitcom|| Alfonso del Real
|-
| Las Doce caras de Eva || 1971–1972 || Sitcom|| Juan Diego
|-
| Las Doce caras de Juan || 1967 || Sitcom|| Alberto Closas
|-
| Doce cuentos y una pesadilla || 1967 || Drama series ||
|-
| Las Doce en punta || 1989 || Variety show|| Joaquín Arozamena
|-
| Doce lecciones de felicidad conyugal || 1969 || Sitcom|| Pedro Osinaga and María José Alfonso
|-
| Doctor Romero || 2017 || Science || Nicolás Romero
|-
| Documentos TV || 1986- || Documentary|| Pedro Erquicia
|-
| Dogtanian and the Three Muskehounds || 1982–1983 || Children||
|-
| El Domin... gol || 1997 || Sports || Pedro Ruiz
|-
| Un Domingo cualquiera || 2003–2004 || Variety show|| Ramón García
|-
| El Domingo es nuestro || 1986–1987 || Variety show|| Natalia Millán
|-
| Domingueros || 1989 || Sports|| Joaquín Arozamena
|-
| Don Baldomero y su gente || 1982 || Sitcom || Luis Escobar
|-
| Don José, Pepe y Pepito || 1965 || Sitcom|| José Bódalo
|-
| Don Quijote de la Mancha || 1980 || Children|| Fernando Fernán Gómez
|-
| Donde comen dos || 2019 || Cooking show || El Langui
|-
| Dos cadenas para ti || 1990 || Variety show|| Guillermo Summers and Susana Hernández
|-
| Dos en la ciudad || 1965 || Sitcom ||
|-
| Dos en uno || 1959 || Variety show || Miguel de los Santos
|-
| Dos parejas y un destino || 2021 || Travel|| 
|-
| Dos por dos || 1978 || Interviews|| Mercedes Milá and Isabel Tenaille
|-
| Dos rombos|| 2004–2005 || Science || Lorena Berdún
|-
| Dos vidas || 2021-2022 || Soap Opera || Laura Ledesma
|-
| Dossier || 1978 || Documentary|| Javier Basilio, Jesús González Green and Luis Pancorbo
|-
 | Dúos increíbles || 2022-  ||Talent Show|| Juan y Medio.
|-
| La edad de oro || 1983–1985 || Music|| Paloma Chamorro
|-
| El Edén || 1987 || Music || Miguel Ángel Jenner
|-
| Edición especial || 1963–1969 || News|| Federico Gallo and Enrique Rubio
|-
| Effecto ciudadano || 2013–2014 || Public service || Arnau Benlloch
|-
| El que dice ser y llamarse || 1965–1966 || Comedy|| Tony Leblanc
|-
| Los Electroduendes || 1986–1988 || Children|| Miguel Ángel Jenner
|-
| Ellas || 2017 || Documentary || Blanca Portillo
|-
| Empléate a fondo || 1996–2000 || Variety show || Yolanda Vázquez
|-
| Emprendedores || 2005–2008|| Variety show||
|-
| En antena || 1963–1965 || Variety show|| Pedro Macía, Marisa Medina and Isabel Bauzá
|-
| En broma || 1961 || Comedy || Cassen
|-
| En buena hora || 1990–1991 || Variety show|| Joaquín Arozamena
|-
| En equipo || 1970–1971 || Variety show|| José Luis Uribarri and Alfredo Amestoy
|-
| En este país || 1981–1982 || News || Ladislao Azcona
|-
| En familia || 1987–1988 || Talk show || Iñaki Gabilondo
|-
| En la cuerda floja || 1985 || Variety show || El Gran Wyoming
|-
| En La 2 || 2010– || News|| Mara Torres
|-
| En la naturaleza || 1987 || Science|| Sonia Martínez
|-
| En la tuya o en la mía || 2015–2016 || Talk show || Bertín Osborne
|-
| En lengua de signos || 2008- || News|| Paloma Soroa
|-
| En marcha || 1985–1986 || Sports || Eva Nasarre
|-
| En noches como ésta || 2008–2010 || Interviews || Juan Ramón Lucas
|-
| En órbita || 1967 || Comedy || Tony Leblanc
|-
| En otras palabras || 1997–2008 || News || María José Aristizábal
|-
| En paralelo || 1982–1984 || Variety show || Ignacio Salas and Elena Markínez
|-
| En portada || 2001- || Documentary ||
|-
| En verde || 2003–2004 || Science || Santiago López Castillo and Adela Cantalapiedra
|-
 | Encuentros  || 2022-  || Talk Show || Elena Sánchez and Jesús Marchamalo
|-
| Encuentros con las letras || 1976–1981 || Science || Elena Escobar and Roberto Llamas
|-
| Encuentros en libertad || 1982–1984 || Science || Sibely Valle
|-
| Los Encuentros || 1966–1967 || Science || 
|-
| Las Enfermeras || 1963 || Drama series || Nuria Torray and María Massip
|-
| Enfoque || 2004–2007 || News || Pedro Piqueras and Elena Sánchez
|-
| Enigma || 1963–1964 || Drama series || Arturo López
|-
 | Enred@d@s || 2022 || Variety show|| María Gómez and Sara Escudero.
|-
| Entre amigos || 1985–1989 || Variety show || José Luis Moreno
|-
| Entre líneas || 1988–1990 || Science || Carmen Posadas
|-
| Entre Morancos y Omaitas || 1997–1998 || Comedy || Los Morancos
|-
| Entre naranjos || 1998 || Drama series || Toni Cantó and Nina
|-
| Entre nosotras || 1957–1958 || Variety show || Elena Santonja and Chus Lampreave
|-
| Entre todos || 2013–2014 || Variety show || Toñi Moreno
|-
| Entre tú y yo || 1997 || Variety show || Laura Valenzuela
|-
| Entrevista a la carta || 2012 || Interviews || Julia Otero
|-
| Los Episodios || 1979 || Children || Francisco Merino
|-
| Equipo de vuelo || 1964 || Drama series|| Alfredo Mayo
|-
| Érase una vez la tele || 1996 || Videos || Guillermo Summers and Susana Hernández
|-
| ¿Es usted el asesino? || 1968 || Drama series|| Narciso Ibáñez Menta
|-
| Escala en hi-fi || 1961–1967 || Music || Fernando García de la Vega
|-
| Escala internacional || 1978 || Variety show ||
|-
| Escalera interior, escalera exterior || 1986 || Sitcom || Agustín González
|-
| La Escalera mecánica || 2000 || Variety show || Jordi González
|-
| El Escarabajo verde || 1997 || Science || Pere Ortín
|-
| Escrito en América || 1979 || Drama series ||
|-
| Escritores en televisión || 1968–1969 || Drama series || Alfredo Mayo
|-
| Escuela de maridos || 1963–1965 || Sitcom || Elvira Quintillá
|-
| Escuela de matrimonios || 1967 || Sitcom || Elvira Quintillá
|-
| Escuela de salud || 1975 || Science || Manuel Torreiglesias
|-
| Escuela del deporte || 1999–2005 || Sports || Carlos Beltrán, Estela Giménez and Sandra Daviú
|-
| Escuela TV || 1962 || Science || Adela Cantalapiedra, Marisa Medina and Clara Isabel Francia
|-
| Ese programa del que usted me habla ||2018–2019 || Comedy || Marta Flich 
|-
| Espacio XX || 1981 || Science || Carmen Tomás
|-
| España a ras de cielo || 2013 || Documentary || Francis Lorenzo
|-
| La España de los Botejara || 1978 || Docudrama || Alfredo Amestoy
|-
| España Directo || 2005–2022  || News || Pilar García Muñiz
|-
| España en comunidad || 2000- || News || Patricia Betancort
|-
| España en directo || 1971–1972 || News || Tico Medina
|-
| España.es || 2005 || Science || Mon Santiso
|-
| España Innova || 2005–2006 || Science || Sandra Sutherland, Mónica Aragón and Tania Herreras
|-
| La España salvaje || 1996 || Science || Felipe de Borbón
|-
| El español y los siete pecados capitales || 1980 || Sitcom || Jesús Puente and Juanjo Menéndez
|-
| Españoles en el mundo || 2005|| Documentary || Miguel Ángel Tobías
|-
| Españoles en el mundo || 2009–2015 || Documentary ||
|-
| Españoles en el Pacífico || 1980 || Documentary || Miguel de la Quadra-Salcedo
|-
| Españoles || 1983 || Interviews || Victoria Prego
|-
| Especial pop || 1969–1970 || Music || Miguel de los Santos, Elsa Baeza and Manuel Galiana
|-
| El Espectador y el lenguaje || 1969–1970 || Science || Manuel Criado de Val
|-
| Los Espectáculos || 1978–1979 || Variety show || Clara Isabel Francia, Isabel Bauzá and José María Comesaña
|-
| El Espejo mágico || 1985–1986 || Variety show || Isabel Bauzá
|-
| Espejo secreto || 1997–1998 || Comedy || Norma Duval
|-
| Espinete no existe || 2016–2017 ||Variety show || Eduardo Aldán
|-
| Esta es mi historia || 2001–2004 || Talk show || Ana García Lozano
|-
| Esta es mi tierra || 1983 || Documentary ||
|-
| Esta es su casa || 1990–1991 || Variety show || María Teresa Campos
|-
| Ésta es su vida || 1962–1968/1993 || Variety show || Federico Gallo and Ricardo Fernández Deu
|-
| Esta mañana || 2008–2009 || Variety show || Pepa Bueno and Inmaculada Galván
|-
| Esta noche || 1981–1982 || Interviews || Carmen Maura
|-
| Esta noche con... || 1969–1970 || Music || Conchita Bautista
|-
| Esta noche... fiesta || 1976 || Variety show || José María Íñigo
|-
| Esta noche Pedro || 1986 || Comedy || Pedro Ruiz
|-
| Esta semana || 1982–1983 || Variety show || Cristina García Ramos and Florencio Solchaga
|-
| La Estación de Perpignán || 1987 || Culture || Paloma Chamorro
|-
| Estadio 1 || 2015–2016 || Sports || Juan Carlos Rivero
|-
| Estadio 2 || 1984–2007 || Sports || Olga Viza
|-
| Estamos de vuelta || 1995–1997 || Comedy || Cruz y Raya
|-
| Estamos en directo || 1999 || Comedy || Cruz y Raya
|-
| Este no es el programa de los viernes || 1998 || Comedy || Cruz y Raya
|-
| Este planeta || 1970 || Science || Jaime de Foxá
|-
| Este señor de negro || 1975–1976 || Sitcom || José Luis López Vázquez
|-
| Estilo || 1962 || Variety show || Marisol González
|-
| Esto es espectáculo || 1994–1996 || Variety show || Bárbara Rey
|-
| Esto es lo que hay || 1985 || Variety show|| El Gran Wyoming
|-
| Esto es lo que hay || 1995–1996 || Interviews || Àngel Casas
|-
| Esto es vida || 2004–2005 || Variety show || Juan Ramón Lucas
|-
| Esto es vida || 2015–2016 || Health || Cristina Lasvignes
|-
| Esto no es lo que parece || 1994–1995 || Talk show || Jordi Estadella
|-	
| Estoy vivo || 2017–2021 || Serie dramática|| Javier Gutiérrez
|-
| Estravagario || 2004–2007 || Science || Javier Rioyo
|-
| Estrellas en 625 líneas || 1963 || Variety show || Joaquín Soler Serrano
|-
| Estress || 1991 || Variety show || Bibiana Fernández, Rossy de Palma and Loles León
|-
| Estudio 1 || 1965–1985 || Theatre ||
|-
| Estudio 3 || 1963–1965 || Theatre ||
|-
| Estudio abierto || 1970–1985 || Interviews || José María Íñigo
|-
| Estudio Estadio || 1972–2005 || Sports || Matías Prats Luque, Pedro Ruiz and Juan Carlos Rivero
|-
| Estudio galerías || 1960 || Variety show || Daniel Vindel
|-
| Etcétera || 1977 || Culture || Jana Escribano, Eva Gloria and Lola Martínez
|-
| Eurocanción || 2000–2001 || Music || Carlos Lozano
|-
| Eurofestival || 1964–1965 || Music || José Luis Barcelona
|-
| Eurojunior || 2003 || Music || Carlos Lozano
|-
| Europa, Europa || 1987|| Science || Pedro Erquicia
|-
| Eva a las diez || 1977|| Music ||Fernando García de la Vega
|-
| Eva frente al espejo || 1970 || Drama series || Mary Carrillo
|-
| Eva y Adán, agencia matrimonial || 1990 || Sitcom || Verónica Forqué and Antonio Resines
|-
| Evocación || 1982–1983 || Videos || Blanca Aguete
|-
| Los Excluidos || 2000 || Documentary || Carmen Sarmiento
|-
| Exterior día || 1981 || Variety show|| Olga Viza
|-
| Extra || 2006 || Comedy || Tonino and Aina Cerdá
|-
| Fábrica de ideas || 2008 || Variety show ||Sandra Barneda
|-
| Fabricando: Made in Spain || 2013–2015 || Variety show || Liborio García
|-
| Fábulas || 1968–1970 || Sitcom || Jaime de Armiñán
|-
| Fago || 2008 || Drama series || Jordi Rebellón
|-
| La Familia Colón || 1967 || Drama series || Nuria Carresi
|-
| La Familia por dentro || 1960 || Science || Adriano del Valle
|-
| Famosos y familia || 1999 || Sitcom || Carmen Maura
|-	
| Fantastic Dúo || 2017|| Music|| Nuria Roca
|-
| Fantástico || 1978–1981 || Variety show || José María Íñigo
|-
| Fauna || 1968–1970 || Science || Félix Rodríguez de la Fuente
|-
| Los Felices 80 || 1990 || Sitcom || Xabier Elorriaga
|-
| Fernández, punto y coma || 1963–1964 || Sitcom || Adolfo Marsillach and María Massip
|-
| Festival Marconi || 1957–1958 || Variety show || Pedro Terol and Victoriano Fernández de Asís
|-
| Festival || 1970–1974 || Variety show || José Antonio Rosa
|-
| Festival de la Canción Infantil de TVE || 1967–1973 || Music ||
|-
| Fetiche || 1996 || Sitcom || Lola Baldrich
|-
| Ficciones || 1971–1981|| Theatre || Sergi Schaaff
|-
| Fiesta brava || 1959–1964 || Bullfighting || Manuel Lozano Sevilla
|-
| Fiesta || 1974–1975 || Children || Luis Barbero and Judy Stephen
|-
| Fiesta con nosotros || 1962 || Children || Juan Viñas and Herta Frankel
|-
| Fiesta suprema || 2013–2014 || Variety show || Loulogio, Bolli, Outconsumer
|-
| Fila 7 || 1983–1984 || Movies || Rosa María Mateo
|-
| Fila cero || 1958–1962 || Theatre ||
|-
| Fin de semana || 1963–1970 || Variety show || José Luis Uribarri, Marisa Medina and Federico Gallo
|-
| Fin de siglo || 1985–1987 || Interviews || Pablo Lizcano
|-
| Firmado Pérez || 1963 || Sitcom || Agustín González
|-
| El Flechazo || 1997–1998 || Game show || Anabel Alonso and Asunción Embuena
|-
| FM 2 || 1988–1989 || Music || Christina Rosenvinge
|-
| Follow Through || 1986–1987 || Science || Juan Antonio Ollero and Izaskun Azurmendi
|-
| La forja de un rebelde || 1990 || Drama series || Antonio Valero
|-
| Foro TV || 1963–1965 || Interviews || Victoriano Fernández de Asís
|-
| Fortunata y Jacinta || 1980 || Drama series || Ana Belén and Maribel Martín
|-
| El final del camino || 2017 || Drama Series || Antonio Velázquez
|-
| Fragmentos de interior || 1984 || Drama series || Emma Suárez
|-
| Fronteras al límite || 2015 || Documentary || 
|-
| Las Fronteras de la ciencia || 1966 || Science || Luis Miravitlles
|-
| Fuera de clase || 2014 || Children || David Bustamante
|-
| Fuera de control || 2006 || Sitcom || Loles León
|-
| Fuera de lugar || 2008 || Sitcom || Natalia Dicenta
|-
 | Fuerza de paz || 2022-2023 || Drama Series  || Silvia Alonso and Martiño Rivas.
|-
| Fugitiva || 2018 || Drama Series || Paz Vega
|-
| Función de noche || 1996–1997 || Theatre ||
|-
| Gaceta cultural || 1979–1981 || Culture || Julio César Fernández and Jana Escribano
|-
| Gafapastas || 2011 || Game show || Juanra Bonet
|-
| Galas del sábado || 1969–1970 || Music || Joaquín Prat and Laura Valenzuela
|-
| Galería || 1973–1974 || Culture || Paloma Chamorro
|-
| Galería de esposas || 1960 || Sitcom || Margot Cottens
|-
| Galería de maridos || 1959 || Sitcom || Adolfo Marsillach and Amparo Baró
|-
| Gama || 1966–1970 || Variety show ||
|-
| Gane su viaje || 1961–1962 || Game show || Jorge Arandes
|-
| Gatos en el tejado || 1988 || Drama series || José Sacristán and Emma Cohen
|-
| Géminis, venganza de amor || 2002–2003 || Soap opera || Ana Turpin and Isabel Serrano
|-
| Generación 800 || 1985 || Science || Isabel Borondo
|-
| Generación Rock || 2013 || Talent show || Melendi
|-
| Generación web || 2015 || Science || 
|-
| Gente || 1995–2011 || Variety show || Pepa Bueno and Sonia Ferrer
|-
| +Gente || 2011–2013 || Variety show || Pilar García Muñiz and Anne Igartiburu
|-
| Gente de primera || 1993 || News || Iñaki Gabilondo
|-
| Gente de Primera || 2005 || Game show || Esther Arroyo and Jorge Fernández
|-
| Gente del sábado || 1977|| Variety show || Tico Medina
|-
| Gente hoy || 1976–1981 || Variety show || Isabel Tenaille, Mari Cruz Soriano and Javier Vázquez
|-
| Gente joven || 1974–1987 || Talent show || Jesús Villarino, Marisa Abad and Mercedes Rodríguez
|-
| La Gente quiere saber || 1973 || Interviews || José María Íñigo
|-
| Gigantes de La 2 || 2018 || Interviews || Mari Cruz Soriano
|-
| Gira || 2014 || Docudrama || 
|-
| El Gladiador || 2002 || Game show || Ramón García
|-
| Un Globo, dos globos, tres globos || 1974–1979 || Children || María Luisa Seco
|-
| Gol... y al mundial 82 || 1981–1982 || Game show || Miguel Vila
|-
| La Goleta || 1958 || Comedy || Tony Leblanc and José Luis Ozores
|-
| Las Gomas  || 1956 || Comedy || Tony Leblanc
|-
| El Gong show || 2007 || Game show || Paz Padilla
|-
| Goya || 1985 || Drama series || Enric Majó
|-
| Los Gozos y las sombras || 1982 || Drama series || Eusebio Poncela, Amparo Rivelles and Charo López
|-
| Gracias por todo || 1997 || Reality show || Ana Obregón
|-
| Graderío || 1963–1964 || Sports || Manuel Lozano Sevilla, Matías Prats and Miguel Ors
|-
| El Gran circo de TVE || 1973–1991 || Children|| Los payasos de la tele
|-
| Gran circo || 1961|| Children || Fernando García de la Vega
|-
 | Gran confusión, La || 2022-|| Talk Show|| Javier Sardà
|-
| La Gran ocasión || 1972–1974 || Game show|| Miguel de los Santos
|-
| Gran parada || 1959–1964 || Variety show || Ana María Solsona, Carmina Alonso and Isabel Bauzá
|-
| Gran premio || 1966–1967 || Game show || Federico Gallo, Antolín García and Miguel Ors
|-
| Gran Reserva || 2010–2013 || Drama series|| Emilio Gutiérrez Caba and Ángela Molina
|-
| Gran Reserva. El origen || 2013 || Drama series || Víctor Clavijo and Verónica Sánchez
|-
| El Gran reto musical || 2017 || Talent Show || Eva González
|-
| Gran Splash || 2000 || Game show || David Meca
|-
| Gran teatro || 1960–1964|| Theatre ||
|-
| Grand Prix || 1995–2005 || Game show || Ramón García
|-
| La Guagua || 1975–1977 || Children || Torrebruno and Paula Gardoqui
|-
| Guante blanco || 2008 || Drama series|| Carlos Hipólito
|-
| La Guerra de los mandos || 2008 || Videos || Inma del Moral
|-
| Habitación 503 || 1993–1994 || Sitcom || Francisco Cecilio and María Luisa San José
|-
| Habitación 508 || 1966 || Sitcom || Adolfo Marsillach
|-
| Hablando claro || 1987–1992 || Game show || Salvador Valdés, Inka Martí and Ana García Siñeriz
|-
 | Hablando claro || 2022- || Variety Show || Lourdes Maldonado.
|-
| Hablamos || 1977–1982 || News || Marisol González
|-
| Hablemos de sexo || 1990 || Science || Elena Ochoa
|-
| Hacer de comer || 2019–2020 || Cooking show|| Dani García
|-
| Hacia la fama || 1958–1959 || Talent show || Blanca Álvarez
|-
| Hasta luego cocodrilo || 1991 || Sitcom || Amparo Baró
|-
| Hasta que la tele nos separe || 2006 || Comedy || Paz Padilla
|-
| Hay que vivir || 2007 ||Reality show || Almudena Ariza and Mariola Ruiz
|-
| Las Hazañas de Marianín y Teresita || 1957 || Children || Alberto Muñiz and María José Valero
|-
| Herederos || 2007–2009 || Drama series|| Concha Velasco
|-
| Hermenegildo Pérez, para servirle || 1966 || Sitcom || Carlos Larrañaga
|-
| Héroes invisibles || 2016–2017 || Documentary || 
|-
| Una Hija más || 1991 || Sitcom || Miguel Rellán and Mercedes Sampietro
|-
| Hijos de Babel || 2008 || Game show || Antonio Garrido
|-
| Los Hijos del frío || 1991 || Science|| Ramón Sánchez Ocaña
|-
| Hilo directo || 1968–1969 || News || Federico Gallo
|-
| Hispanovisión || 1970 || Variety show || José Luis Uribarri
|-
| Historia de nuestro cine || 2015– || Movies || Elena S. Sánchez
|-
| La Historia de San Michele || 1964 || Drama series || Narciso Ibáñez Serrador and Narciso Ibáñez Menta
|-
| Historias de Alcafrán || 2020 || Sitcom || Álex Gadea
|-
| Historias de hoy || 1967|| Drama series||
|-
| Historias de Juan Español || 1972–1973 || Sitcom || Juanjo Menéndez
|-
| Historias del otro lado || 1991|| Drama series || José Luis Garci
|-
| Historias de mi barrio || 1964 || Sitcom|| Félix Navarro and Luchy Soto
|-
| Historias naturales || 1967–1968|| Sitcom ||
|-
| Historias para no dormir || 1965–1970/1982|| Drama series|| Narciso Ibáñez Serrador
|-
| HIT || 2020- || Drama series || Daniel Grao
|-
| Hit - La canción || 2015 || Talent show || Jaime Cantizano
|-
| Hogar, dulce hogar || 1959–1960 || Sitcom || Ángel de Andrés
|-
| Hola chicos || 1984–1987 || Children || María Luisa Seco
|-
| Hola, ola || 1996 || Music || Miguel Ortiz and María Adánez
|-
| ¡Hola Raffaella! || 1992–1994 || Game show|| Raffaella Carrà
|-
| El hombre de tu vida || 2016 || Drama Series || José Mota
|-
| El Hombre y la Tierra || 1974–1980 || Documentary || Félix Rodríguez de la Fuente
|-
| El Hombre, ese desconocido || 1963–1964 || Science|| José María Prada
|-
| Hombres que dejan huella || 1966 || Science || Federico Gallo
|-
| Los hombres saben, los pueblos marchan || 1969–1970 || Game show || Joaquín Soler Serrano
|-
| Hora 15 || 1977–1979 ||Culture || Manuel Martín Ferrand and Jana Escribano
|-
| La Hora de... || 1975–1976|| Music ||Fernando García de la Vega
|-
| La Hora de José Mota || 2009–2012 || Comedy || José Mota
|-
| La Hora de La 1 || 2020– || Variety ||Mònica López
|-
| La Hora del lector || 1987–1988 || Science || Luis Carandell
|-
| La Hora del TPT || 1988–1989 || Game show || José Luis Coll, Andrés Caparrós and Ignacio Salas
|-
| La Hora Musa || 2018–2021 || Music ||Maika Makovski
|-
| Hora once || 1969–1974|| Theatre ||
|-
| La Hora Philips || 1957 || Variety show || Jesús Álvarez and María José Valero
|-
| Hora punta || 1969 || Science || Victoriano Fernández de Asís
|-
| Hora punta || 2016–2018 || Variety Show || Javier Cárdenas
|-
| Horas doradas || 1980|| Music||
|-
| Horizontes || 1977–1981 || Science || Ramón Sánchez Ocaña and Marisa Naranjo
|-
| Hospital Valle Norte || 2019 || Drama Series || Alexandra Jiménez
|-
| Hostal Royal Manzanares || 1996–1998 || Sitcom || Lina Morgan
|-
| El Hotel de las mil y una estrellas || 1978–1979 || Comedy || Luis Aguilé
|-	
| Hotel romántico || 2017 || Dating show|| Roberto Leal
|-
| Hoy 14, 15 || 1974–1975 || Variety show|| José María Íñigo
|-
| Hoy de 6 a 7 || 1990 || Variety show|| Concha Galán and Goyo González
|-
| Hoy dirige || 1961 || Sitcom|| Gustavo Pérez Puig
|-
| Hoy es fiesta || 1959 || Variety show || María Mahor
|-
| Hoy es posible || 1997 || Reality show || Nieves Herrero
|-
| Hoy llegó la primavera || 1963 || Sitcom|| Carlos Larrañaga and María Luisa Merlo
|-
| Hoy no, mañana || 2019 || Comedy || José Mota
|-
| Hoy por hoy || 1976 || Variety show|| Tico Medina and Jana Escribano
|-
| Hoy también es fiesta || 1970–1975 || Children || Torrebruno, Kiko Ledgard and Luis Barbero
|-
| La Huella del crimen|| 1985|| Drama series ||
|-
| La Huella del hombre || 1969–1970 || Science || Rafael de Penagos
|-
| Humanos y divinos || 2010 || Interviews || Boris Izaguirre
|-
| El Humor de tu vida || 2004 || Comedy || Las Veneno and Bermúdez
|-
| Identity || 2007–2008 || Game show || Antonio Garrido
|-	
| iFamily || 2017 || Sitcom || Antonio Resines and Raúl Fernández de Pablo
|-
| La Imagen de tu vida || 2006 || Videos || Jesús Hermida
|-
| Imagen de una vida || 1956–1957 || Science|| Victoriano Fernández de Asís
|-
| Imágenes || 1978–1981 || Culture || Paloma Chamorro
|-
| Imágenes para saber || 1966–1967 || Science || Manuel Martín Ferrand
|-
| Imágenes prohibidas || 1994 || Science||
|-
| El Imperdible || 1997–1998 || Variety show|| Anne Igartiburu
|-	
| Imprescindibles || 2010– || Documentary|| 
|-
| In fraganti || 2000–2001 || Comedy || Paz Padilla
|-
| Informativo juvenil || 1980–1982 || Children || Francisco García Novell
|-
| El Informe del día || 1992 || News || José Antonio Martínez Soler and Inka Martí
|-
| Informe semanal || 1973- || News || Rosa María Mateo, Mari Carmen García Vela and Baltasar Magro
|-
| Insuperables || 2015 || Talent show || Carolina Cerezuela
|-
| Las Instituciones || 1974–1975 || Science || Alberto Delgado
|-
| Investigación en marcha || 1970 || News || Enrique Rubio and Pedro Macía
|-
| Isabel || 2012 || Drama series || Michelle Jenner
|-
| Jacinto Durante, representante || 2000 || Sitcom || Javier Manrique
|-
| Jardilín || 1966–1968 || Children || Charo Tijero
|-
|  || 1983–1984 || Drama series || Fernando Fernán Gómez and Verónica Forqué
|-
| Jazz entre amigos || 1984–1991 || Music || Juan Claudio Cifuentes
|-
| Jimanji kanana || 2003 || Game show || Rosa García Caro
|-
| Los jinetes del alba || 1990 || Drama series || Victoria Abril, Jorge Sanz and Maribel Verdú
|-
| José Mota presenta || 2015–2016 || Comedy || José Mota
|-
| Juan y José show || 2004–2006 || Comedy || Cruz y Raya
|-
| Juan y Manuela || 1974 || Sitcom || Jaime Blanch and Ana Diosdado
|-
|  || 1982 || Drama series || Violeta Cela and Conrado San Martín
|-
| Juega con nosotros || 1991 || Game show || Jordi Hurtado
|-
| Juegas o qué || 2019 || Game show || Luis Larrodera
|-
| El Juego de la foca || 1972–1974 || Game show || Félix Acaso and José Miguel Flores
|-
| El Juego de la oca || 1966–1967 || Game show || Joaquín Soler Serrano
|-
| Juego de letras || 1972–1973 || Game show || Joaquín Soler Serrano
|-
| El Juego de los errores || 1982–1983 || Game show || Joaquín Calvo Sotelo and Isabel Borondo
|-
| Juego de niños || 1989–1991, 2019 || Game show || Amparo Soler Leal, Ignacio Salas, Tina Sáinz and Javier Sardá
|-
| Juegos para mayores || 1971 || Drama series ||
|-
| Juegos sin fronteras || 1988–1992 || Game show || Ignacio Salas, Guillermo Summers and Isabel Gemio
|-
| El Juglar y la reina || 1978–1979 || Drama series ||
|-
| Jugamos en casa || 2015|| Game show|| Los Morancos
|-
| Jugando con las estrellas || 2017 ||Game show|| Jaime Cantizano
|-
| Juguemos al trivial || 1992 || Game show || Pepe Navarro
|-
| Juicio Sumarísimo || 1958–1959 || Science || Tico Medina and Yale
|-
| Juncal || 1987 || Drama series|| Francisco Rabal
|-
| Juntas, pero no revueltas || 1995–1996 || Sitcom|| Mercedes Sampietro, Mónica Randall and Kiti Manver
|-
| Juvenil cultural || 1982 || Children || Daniel Vindel
|-
| Kilómetro lanzado || 1966 || Game show || Federico Gallo and José Luis Barcelona
|-
| El Kiosco  || 1984–1987 || Children || Verónica Mengod
|-
| Langostino || 1987 || Comedy || Jordi Estadella
|-
| Lápiz y papel || 1981 || Game show || Ángel Quesada and José Carabias
|-
| Lazos de sangre || 2018–2019 || Documentary || 
|-
| ¿Le conoce usted? || 1974–1975 || Game show || Pedro Ruiz
|-
| Lecciones de tocador || 1983 || Sitcom || Rafael Alonso and Luis Varela
|-
| Lección de ocio || 1964–1965 || Variety show || José Luis Barcelona
|-
| El Lector || 1994–1996 || Science|| Agustín Remesal
|-
| El Legado || 2015|| Game show|| Ramón García
|-
| Lengua viva || 1977–1978 || Science || Manuel Criado de Val
|-
| Leo contra todos || 1984 || Game show || Rita Irasema
|-
| Leonart || 2006–2009 || Game show || Iván Labanda and Jordi Soriano
|-
| Letra pequeña || 1984–1986 || Science || Isabel Tenaille
|-
| Letris || 2013 || Game show || Carlos Latre
|-
| La Ley y la vida || 2000 || Drama series || Toni Cantó
|-
| El Libro gordo de Petete || 1981–1983 || Children || María del Carmen Goñi
|-
| Los Libros  || 1974–1977 || Drama series ||
|-
| Línea 900 || 1991–2007 || Science ||
|-
| Lingo || 1993–1996 || Game show|| Ramoncín
|-
| La Lista || 2008–2010 || Game show || Daniel Domenjó and Carlos Sobera
|-
| Llamada al corazón || 1964 || Reality show || Federico Gallo and Enrique Rubio
|-
| Llamada al diálogo || 1966 || Talk show|| Victoriano Fernández de Asís
|-
| La Llamada de la suerte || 1998 || Game show|| Ramón García and Concha Galán
|-
| La Llamada de los gnomos  || 1987 || Children ||
|-
| Llave en mano || 1991 || Game show || Marisa Medina
|-
| Llegada internacional || 1973–1974 || Comedy || Luis Aguilé and Paloma Hurtado
|-
| Lluvia de estrellas || 2007 || Talent show|| Sonia Ferrer
|-
| Lo de Tip y Coll || 1974–1975 || Comedy || Tip y Coll
|-
| Lo que en tiempos se llevó || 1995 || Videos|| Guillermo Summers and Susana Hernández
|-
| Lo que hay que tener || 1995 || Variety show|| Leticia Sabater
|-
| Lo siguiente || 2018–2019 || Variety Show || Raquel Sánchez-Silva
|-
| Lo tuyo es puro teatro || 1998–2000 || Theatre|| Natalia Dicenta
|-
| El Loco de la colina || 2006 || Interviews|| Jesús Quintero
|-
| La Locomotora || 1979 || Children|| Torrebruno
|-
| Locos por la tele || 1990–1991 || Game show || Ferran Rañé
|-
| Lolita tiene un plan || 2017 || Talk show|| Lolita Flores
|-
| Longitud, latitud || 1992 ||Science || Felipe Mellizo
|-
| Lorca, muerte de un poeta || 1987 || Drama series || Nickolas Grace
|-
| Luces en la noche || 1966–1974 || Variety show||
|-
| La Luna || 1989–1990 || Interviews|| Julia Otero
|-
| Luna negra || 2003–2004 || Soap opera || Lorena Bernal
|-
| Los Lunes con Ángel || 1964–1965 || Comedy || Ángel de Andrés
|-
| Los Lunnis || 2003–2010 || Children|| Lucrecia
|-
| Luz verde || 1966–1968 || Science|| Natalia Figueroa
|-
| Made in China || 2005 || Science || Óscar Terol
|-
| Maestros de la costura || 2018– || Talent Show || Raquel Sánchez-Silva
|-
| Magia potagia || 1988 || Variety show|| Juan Tamariz
|-
| Makinavaja || 1995–1997 || Sitcom || Pepe Rubianes
|-
| Malaka || 2019 || Drama Series || Maggie Civantos
|-
| Mamás y papás a la vista || 2018 || Docu-Reality|| 
|-
| La Mandrágora || 1997–2009 || Science|| Rocío Muñoz
|-
| Los Maniáticos || 1974 || Sitcom || José Sazatornil
|-
| Mano a mano || 1981 || Interviews || Joaquim Maria Puyal
|-
| Manos al volante || 1968–1970 || Science || Enrique Rubio and Marisa Medina
|-
| La Mansión de los Plaff || 1979–1981 || Children|| María Fernanda D'Ocón
|-
| Mañana es sábado || 1966–1967 || Variety show || Elvira Quintillá
|-
| Mañana puede ser verdad || 1964–1965|| Drama series ||Narciso Ibáñez Serrador
|-
| La Mañana de La 1 || 2009–2020 || Variety show || Mariló Montero
|-
| Mañanas de primera || 1996 || Variety show || Laura Valenzuela
|-
| Mapi || 2022|| Quiz Show|| Jandro
|-
| La Mar, ese mundo maravilloso || 1968–1969 || Science|| Mario Beut
|-
| Los Marginados || 1982–1991 || Documentary || Carmen Sarmiento
|-
| Maridos y mujeres || 1997 || Game show|| Alonso Caparrós and Anne Igartiburu
|-
| El Martes que viene || 1990 || Interviews || Mercedes Milá
|-
| Más allá || 1976–1981 || Science || Fernando Jiménez del Oso
|-
| Más estrellas que en el cielo || 1988–1989 || Interviews|| Terenci Moix
|-
| Más lejos || 1971–1973 || Sports || Juan Antonio Fernández Abajo and José Félix Pons
|-
| Más que en vivo || 2014 || Music || Berta Collado and Jordi Mestre
|-
| Más vale prevenir || 1979–1987 || Science || Ramón Sánchez Ocaña
|-
| La Máscara negra  || 1982 || Drama series || Sancho Gracia
|-
| MasterChef || 2013– ||Talent show || Eva González
|-
| MasterChef Celebrity || 2016– ||Talent show || Eva González
|-
| La matemática del espejo || 2021– || Talk show || Carlos del Amor
|-
| El Mayorazgo de Labraz || 1983 || Drama series || Joaquín Hinojosa and Virginia Mataix
|-
| Media hora con... || 1966 || Interviews || Raúl Matas
|-
| Media naranja || 1986 || Sitcom || Amparo Larrañaga and Iñaki Miramón
|-
| La mejor canción jamás cantada || 2019|| Music|| Roberto Leal
|-
| Mejor contigo || 2021-2022 || Talk show || Ion Aramendi
|-
| Los Mejores años || 2009 || Music|| Carlos Sobera and Ángel Llàcer
|-
| Memoria de España || 2004 || Documentary||
|-
| Memorias del cine español || 1978 || Documentary || Joaquim Maria Puyal
|-
| Menos lobos || 1992 || Sitcom || Miguel Rellán
|-
| El Menú de cada día || 1992–1993 || Cooking show || Karlos Arguiñano
|-
| El Menú de Karlos Arguiñano || 1994–1995 || Cooking show|| Karlos Arguiñano
|-
| Menudos Torres || 2002 || Cooking show|| Torres Brothers
|-
| Mercado Central || 2019–2021 || Soap opera || Antonio Garrido and Lola Marceli
|-
| Metrópolis || 1985- ||Culture ||
|-
| Mi abuelo es el mejor || 2006 || Game show|| Concha Velasco
|-
| Mi familia en la mochila || 2015 || Docudrama|| 
|-
| Mi hijo y yo || 1962–1963 || Sitcom|| María Fernanda Ladrón de Guevara and Juan Diego
|-
| Mi no comprender || 1977 || Variety show|| Alfredo Amestoy
|-
| Mi planeta || 2003 || Science || Óscar Martínez
|-
| Mi teniente || 2001 || Sitcom|| Juan Luis Galiardo
|-
| Miguel Servet, la sangre y la ceniza || 1989 || Drama series|| Juanjo Puigcorbé
|-
| Millenium || 2014–2019 || Science || Ramón Colom
|-
| Un Millón para el mejor  || 1968–1969 || Game show|| Joaquín Prat and José Luis Pécker
|-
| El ministerio del tiempo || 2015–2020 || Drama series || Rodolfo Sancho and Hugo Silva
|-
| Mira 2 || 1991 || Variety show|| Concha García Campoy
|-
| ¡Mira quién baila! || 2005–2007 || Talent show|| Anne Igartiburu
|-
| Miradas 2 || 2004–2006 || Culture|| Georgina Cisquella
|-
| Mirador de los deportes || 1980 || Sports|| Miguel Ors
|-
| Mis terrores favoritos || 1981 || Movies || Narciso Ibáñez Serrador and Luisa Armenteros
|-
| Misión Eurovisión || 2007 || Music || Paula Vázquez
|-
| Misterios al descubierto || 1966–1970 || Science|| Luis Miravitlles
|-
| Los misterios de Laura || 2009–2011 || Drama series|| María Pujalte
|-
| Un Mito llamado  || 1979 || Drama series || Nuria Torray
|-
| La Mitad invisible || 2010–2016 || Variety show|| Juan Carlos Ortega
|-
| Mitomanía || 1995–2001 || Videos || Guillermo Summers and Susana Hernández
|-
| Mixto con... || 1982 || Variety show || José María Fraguas
|-
| Modelo para armar || 1997 || Variety show || Clara Isabel Francia
|-
| Mónica a medianoche || 1973 || Variety show|| Mónica Randall
|-
| El Monstruo de Sanchezstein || 1977–1978 || Children|| María Luisa Seco and José Carabias
|-
| Morancos 007 || 2007 || Comedy || Los Morancos
|-
| Mucha marcha || 1996–1999 || Children|| Leticia Sabater
|-
| Muchachada Nui || 2007–2010 || Comedy || Joaquín Reyes
|-
| Muévete en casa || 2020 || Sport|| Cesc Escolá
|-
| Una Mujer de su casa || 1972 || Sitcom|| Elvira Quintillá
|-
| La Mujer de tu vida  || 1990|| Drama series || Carmen Maura and Victoria Abril
|-
| Mujeres || 2006 || Drama series|| Chiqui Fernández
|-
| Mujeres insólitas || 1977 || Drama series ||
|-
| Mujeres solas || 1960–1961 || Sitcom|| Amparo Baró and Alicia Hermida
|-
| Mundo de Juan Lobón || 1989 || Drama series || Luis Fernando Alvés and Maribel Verdú
|-
| El Mundo de la música || 1976–1980 || Music|| Mari Ángeles Morales
|-
| El Mundo de la televisión || 1975–1976 || Variety show || Santiago Vázquez
|-
| El Mundo en 24 horas || 2000–2001 || News || Felipe Sahagún
|-
| El Mundo en acción || 1973–1978 || Documentary|| Miguel de la Quadra-Salcedo
|-
| El Mundo es nuestro || 1986–1987 || Children|| Francisco García Novell
|-
| ¿Un Mundo feliz? || 1981–1987 || Science || Felipe Mellizo
|-
| Mundo noche || 1978–1980 || Music|| Miguel de los Santos
|-
| Un Mundo para ellos || 1979–1983 || Science || Santiago Vázquez
|-
| Mundo pop || 1974 || Music || Fernando Garciapelayo
|-
| Los Mundos de Yupi || 1987–1989 || Children || Consuelo Molina
|-
| La Música || 1967 || Music || María Mahor
|-
| Música ligerísima || 2014–2015 || Music || 
|-
| Música, maestro  || 1981 || Music || Carlos Tena
|-
| Música sí || 1997–2004 || Music || Hugo de Campos
|-
| Música uno || 2004–2006 || Music || Ainhoa Arbizu and Neil Solé
|-
| Música y estrellas || 1976 || Music || Marujita Díaz
|-
| Musica N.A. || 1990-1991 || Music || Lara López; focuses on New Age music.
|-
| Musical || 1967 || Music || José Luis Barcelona and Paca Gabaldón
|-
| Musical 14, 05 || 1965–1967 || Music || Ángel de Andrés
|-
| Musical express || 1980–1983 || Music || Àngel Casas
|-
| Musical pop || 1974–1976 || Music || Ramón Trecet
|-
| Musical popular, cita con... || 1980 || Music || Aurora Claramunt
|-
| Musiqueando || 1977 || Music || Eva Gloria
|-
| Musiquísimos || 1987–1988 || Music || Rafa Izurquiza
|-
| Muy personal || 1987–1988 || Interviews || Pilar Trenas
|-
| El Negociador || 2007 || Game show || Javier Capitán
|-
| Los Negocios de mamá || 1997 || Sitcom|| Rocío Dúrcal
|-
| Negro sobre blanco || 1997–2004 || Culture|| Fernando Sánchez Dragó
|-
| Ni a tontas, ni a locas || 1989 || Comedy|| Las Virtudes
|-
| Ni contigo ni sin ti || 1998 || Sitcom || Pedro Osinaga, Fiorella Faltoyano and Cristina Brondo
|-
| Ni en vivo ni en directo || 1983–1984 || Comedy || Emilio Aragón
|-
| Ninette y un señor de Murcia || 1984 || Sitcom || Juanjo Menéndez and 
|-
| Nivel de vida || 1968–1970 || Science || Blanca Álvarez, Maruja Callaved and Marisa Medina
|-
| Los Niños no sois tan niños || 1976 || Children|| Manolo Codeso
|-
| No disparen al pianista || 2007–2009 || Music || Ruth Jiménez
|-
| No me cortes || 1993 || Children || César Heinrych
|-
| No me cortes 98 || 1998 || Children || Juanra Bonet
|-
| No me lo puedo creer || 1994 || Game show|| Ángeles Martín
|-
| No sé bailar || 1992 ||Sitcom|| Emilio Gutiérrez Caba.
|-
| No se quede sin saberlo || 1963 || Science || Antolín García
|-
| No te lo pierdas || 1990 || Children|| Enrique Simón and Leticia Sabater
|-
| No te rías, que es peor || 1990–1995 || Comedy|| Jordi Estadella and Ramón García
|-
| No veas || 1997–1998 || Variety show|| Pepe Viyuela and Marlène Mourreau
|-
| La Noche || 1989 || Interviews || Fernando Sánchez Dragó
|-
| La Noche abierta || 1998–2004 || Interviews|| Pedro Ruiz
|-
| La Noche al hablar || 1964|| Sitcom||Adolfo Marsillach
|-
| La Noche D || 2021-2022  || Comedy || Dani Rovira
|-
| Noche de estrellas || 1964–1965 || Variety show|| Franz Johan and Gustavo Re
|-
| Noche de fiesta || 1999–2004 || Variety show|| Juncal Rivero and María José Suárez
|-
| La Noche de los castillos || 1995–1996 || Game show || Luis Fernando Alvés
|-
 | Noche de los cazadores, La || 2022- ¿? || Quiz Show|| Ion Aramendi.
|-
| La Noche de Quintero  || 2007 || Interviews || Jesús Quintero
|-
| Noche de teatro || 1974 || Theatre ||
|-
| La Noche del cine español || 1984–1986 || Movies || Fernando Méndez Leite
|-
| Noche del sábado || 1965–1968 || Variety show || Franz Johan and Gustavo Re
|-
| La Noche temática || 1995- || Documentary ||
|-
| Noches de Europa || 1968–1969 || Science||
|-
| Noches de gala || 1993–1994 || Variety show|| Joaquín Prat and Miriam Díaz Aroca
|-
| Nosotras y ellos || 1966–1967 || Sitcom || Julia Martínez and Carlos Muñoz
|-
| Nosotros || 1968 || Variety show || Manuel Martín Ferrand and Alfredo Amestoy
|-
| Nosotros || 1982–1984 || Children|| Francisco García Novell
|-
| Noticiario femenino || 1963 || News|| Ana María Solsona
|-
| Novela || 1962–1979 || Drama Series ||
|-
| La Nube || 2012 || Science|| Toni Garrido
|-
| Nuestra Europa || 1989–1990 || News|| Secundino González
|-
| Nuestra semana || 1986 || News|| Adela Cantalapiedra
|-
| La Nueva geografía || 1963 || Science|| Jesús Álvarez
|-
| Nuevas gentes || 1968–1969 || Science|| Natalia Figueroa
|-
| El Nuevo espectador || 1989–1990 ||Culture || Eduardo Sotillos
|-
| Número 1 || 1987–1988 || Music|| Ángel Prieto and Raquel Aparicio
|-
| Nunca es tarde || 1984 || Theatre || Irene Gutiérrez Caba
|-
| Nunca se sabe || 1986 || Variety show || Joaquín Kremel
|-
| El Obispo leproso || 1990 || Drama series|| Mercedes Sampietro
|-
| Objetivo indiscreto || 1965 || Videos || Simón Cabido
|-
| Objetivo indiscreto || 1992 || Videos || Antonio Resines and Anabel Alonso
|-
| Objetivo || 1981–1982 || Documentary || Luis Pancorbo, Jesús González Green and Carmen Sarmiento
|-
| Objetivo nosotros || 1975 || Science|| Doctor Rosado
|-
| Obra completa || 1971|| Theatre || Pedro Amalio López
|-
| Obsesión || 2005 || Soap opera || Diana Lázaro
|-
| Ochéntame otra vez || 2014–2021 || Documentary || 
|-
| Odiosas || 2006 || Sitcom|| Laura Manzanedo
|-
| La Odisea || 1976 || Drama series || Ferrán Rañé
|-
| Odiseas digitales || 2003–2004 || Science||
|-
| El ojo clínico || 2016 || Science || Ana Gugel
|-
| El Ojo público del ciudadano || 2007 || Science || Juan Ramón Lucas
|-
| Ojos nuevos || 1970–1972 || Science || Jana Escribano
|-
| La Olimpiada del saber || 1964–1965 || Sports || Daniel Vindel
|-
| El Olivar de Atocha || 1988–1989 || Drama series || Enriqueta Carballeira
|-
| Olmos y Robles || 2015–2016 || Sitcom || Rubén Cortada and Pepe Viyuela
|-
| Omaita en la primera || 2001 || Comedy || Los Morancos
|-
| Operación torpedo || 1974 || Comedy || José Miguel Flores
|-
| Operación triunfo || 2001–2004; 2017–2020 || Talent show|| Carlos Lozano & Roberto Leal
|-
| Opinión pública || 1969 || News || Federico Gallo
|-
| Opinión pública || 1978–1981 || News || Alberto Delgado and Nieves Romero
|-
| Orbe || 1961 || Variety show || José Luis Barcelona
|-
| Órbita Laika || 2014– || Science || Ángel Martín
|-
| Original || 1974–1977|| Drama series ||Sergi Schaaff
|-
| OT: El reencuentro || 2016 ||Documentary || 
|-
| Otoño romántico || 1973 || Drama series|| Vicente Parra
|-
| La Otra cara del espejo || 1965 || Drama series || Manuel Dicenta
|-
| La otra mirada || 2018–2019 || Drama Series || Patricia López Arnaiz
|-
| Otras cosas || 1981–1982 || Variety show || Joaquín Prat
|-
| Otros pueblos || 1983–2007 || Documentary|| Luis Pancorbo
|-
| Pablo y Virginia || 1968 || Sitcom || Conchita Montes and Carlos Mendy
|-
| Paco y Veva || 2004 || Sitcom|| Hugo Silva and Elena Ballesteros
|-
| Pacífico || 2016 || Documentary|| Daniel Landa
|-
| Padres en apuros || 2003–2006 || Science || Belinda Washington, Verónica Mengod and Gema Balbás
|-
| Página 2 || 2007–2009 || Culture || Óscar López
|-
| Página de sucesos || 1985–1986 || Drama series|| Patxi Andión and Iñaki Miramón
|-
| Página del domingo || 1975–1976 || News || José Luis Rodríguez Puértolas
|-
| Páginas sueltas || 1970 || Drama series ||
|-
| Un País de sagitario  || 1985 || Variety show|| Silvia Arlet
|-
 | Un País en danza || 2021- || Documentary|| Antonio Najarro
|-
| Un País en la mochila || 1995–2000 || Documentary || José Antonio Labordeta
|-
| Un país mágico || 2017– || Variety show || Miguelillo
|-
| Un País para comérselo || 2010–2014 || Documentary|| Imanol Arias and Juan Echanove
|-
| Un País para escucharlo || 2019-2021 ||Music|| Ariel Rot
|-
 |Un País para leerlo || 2022- || Documentary ||  Mario Obrero.
|-
| Un País para reírlo || 2021- || Comedy || Goyo Jiménez
|-
| Paisaje con figuras || 1976–1977|| Drama series ||Mario Camus and Antonio Gala
|-
| El paisano || 2018– || Documentary || Pablo Chiapella
|-
| Pajareando || 1970 || Comedy || Andrés Pajares
|-
| La Palabra más larga || 1966 || Game show|| Mario Beut
|-
| Palabra por palabra || 2005–2011 || Game show|| Francine Gálvez
|-
| Los Paladines || 1972 || Drama series || Ricardo Palacios
|-
| Palma y Don Jaime || 1959–1960 || Sitcom|| José Luis López Vázquez and Pastor Serrador
|-
| Palmarés || 1976 || Variety show|| Bárbara Rey
|-
| La Palmera || 1991 || Variety show || Jordi González
|-
| Palmo a palmo || 1970 || Sports || Juan Antonio Fernández Abajo and Teresa Gimpera
|-
| Panorama de actualidad || 1963–1970 || News || Santiago Vázquez and Pedro Erquicia
|-
| Panorama || 1960–1963 || News|| Federico Gallo and Enrique Rubio
|-
| Pantalla deportiva || 1959–1963 || Sports|| Matías Prats Cañete
|-
| Pantalla grande || 1967–1968 || Movies|| Luis Pruneda
|-
| Para todos la Dos || 2010– || Variety show|| Montse Tejera and Juanjo Pardo
|-
| Para vosotras || 1964 || Variety show|| Montserrat Cierco
|-
| Paraíso || 2000–2003 || Drama series || Luis Fernando Alvés
|-
| Paraísos cercanos || 1997 || Documentary ||
|-
| Parlamento || 1980–1990 || News|| Manuel Almendros, Alberto Delgado and Santiago López Castillo
|-
| Pasa la vida || 1991–1996 || Variety show || María Teresa Campos
|-
| Pasaporte a Dublín || 1970 || Music || Julio Iglesias and Massiel
|-
| Un Paseo por el tiempo || 1995 || Variety show || Julia Otero
|-
| Patos y ocas || 1981 || Comedy || Máximo
|-
| Los Pazos de Ulloa || 1985 || Drama series || José Luis Gómez, Victoria Abril and Charo López
|-
| PC adictos || 1997 || Science || Sabin Egilior
|-
| Pecadores impequeibols || 2014 || Comedy || Forges
|-
| Pedro I el Cruel || 1989 || Drama series || Ramon Madaula
|-
| Peligrosamente juntas || 1992 || Interviews || Inka Martí and Marisol Galdón
|-
| Pelotas || 2009–2010 || Sitcom || Ángel de Andrés López
|-	
| La Peluquería || 2017 ||Sitcom|| Chiqui Fernández
|-
| El Peor programa de la semana || 1993–1994 || Comedy || El Gran Wyoming
|-
| Pepa y Pepe || 1995 || Sitcom || Verónica Forqué and Tito Valverde
|-
| Peque Prix || 1998–2000 || Children || Ramón García and Carlos Castel
|-
| La Pequeña comedia  || 1966–1968 || Theatre ||
|-
| Pequeño estudio || 1968–1974 || Theatre ||
|-
| Pequeños grandes genios || 2001–2003 || Children || Carlos Larrañaga and Àngel Llàcer
|-
| Perdóname || 1994 || Reality show || María Teresa Campos
|-
| Perfiles || 1979 || Interviews || Joaquín Soler Serrano
|-
| Pero... ¿esto qué es? || 1989–1991|| Comedy || Luis Merlo, Jacqueline de la Vega, Guillermo Montesinos, Marisa Naranjo
|-
| El Perro verde || 1988 || Interviews || Jesús Quintero
|-
| Personajes a trasluz || 1970 || Drama series ||
|-
| Las Pícaras  || 1983 || Drama series ||
|-
| El Pícaro  || 1974 || Drama series || Fernando Fernán Gómez
|-
| Piel de España || 1962–1963 || Science || Jesús Álvarez
|-
| Piensa en positivo || 2013 || Public service || Pablo Pineda
|-
 | Pilares del tiempo, Los || 2022 || Culture|| Leonor Martín and Lidia San José
|-
| Pili, secretaria ideal || 1975 || Sitcom || Elena María Tejeiro and José María Prada
|-
| Pinnic || 1992–1996 || Children || Pere Ponce
|-
| Los Pintores del Prado || 1974 || Science ||
|-
| Pista libre || 1982–1985 || Children || Sandra Sutherland and Izaskun Azurmendi
|-
| Plan América || 2008 || Drama series || José Sancho
|-
| Planeta azul || 1970–1974 || Documentary || Félix Rodríguez de la Fuente
|-
| Planeta comida || 2014 || Cooking || 
|-
| El Planeta de los niños || 2002–2003 || Science || Miriam de las Heras and Belinda Washington
|-
| Planeta encantado || 2003 || Science || Juan José Benítez
|-
| Planeta imaginario || 1983–1986 || Children || Marta Angelat
|-
| Planta baja || 1986 || Sitcom || Enrique Simón
|-
| Plàstic || 1989–1991 || Music || Tinet Rubira, David Bagès and Marisol Galdón
|-
| Platea || 1963 || Theatre ||
|-
| Platos rotos || 1985–1986 || Sitcom || María José Alfonso
|-
| Plató vacío || 1986 || Culture || Cristina Morató
|-
| Plaza de España || 1962–1963 || Variety show || Alfredo Amestoy
|-
| Plaza de España || 2011 || Sitcom || Gorka Otxoa
|-
| Plinio || 1972 || Drama series || Antonio Casal and Alfonso del Real
|-
| Plumier || 1986–1987 || Children || Almudena Solana
|-
| Plutón B.R.B. Nero || 2008–2009 || Sitcom || Manuel Tallafé
|-
| Poder canijo || 2016 || Children || Juan y Medio
|-
| Polideportivo || 1973–1981 || Sports|| Juan Antonio Fernández Abajo, José Félix Pons and José Ángel de la Casa
|-
| Ponte las pilas || 1991–1992 || Music|| Benjamin Barrington, Arancha de Benito and Dani Martín
|-
| Pop que || 1984 || Music|| Carlos Tena
|-
| Popgrama || 1977–1981 || Music|| Carlos Tena and Diego A. Manrique
|-
| Por arte de magia || 1981–1982 || Variety show|| Juan Tamariz
|-
| Por fin has llegado || 2007 || Comedy || Josema Yuste
|-
| Por la mañana || 1987–1989 || Variety show || Jesús Hermida
|-
| Por la mañana || 2002–2008 || Variety show || Inés Ballester
|-
| Por los caminos de España || 1966 || Science ||
|-
| Por los caminos del folklore || 1976 || Music || Antoñita Moreno
|-
| Por tierra, mar y aire || 1968–1972 || News || Ángel Losada and Pedro Macía
|-
| Por tierras lejanas || 1981–1982 || Documentary || Alberto Oliveras
|-
| El Porvenir es largo || 2009 || Soap opera || Silvia Marsó
|-
| Positrón || 1987 || Children || Carlos Ballesteros
|-
| El Precio justo || 1988–1993/1999–2001 || Game show || Joaquín Prat and Carlos Lozano
|-
| Preguntas al espacio || 1958 || Game show || Laura Valenzuela
|-
| La Prehistoria del futuro  || 1974 || Science || Luis Miravitlles
|-
| Premio al mejor || 1971 || Game show || Juan Antonio Fernández Abajo
|-
| El Premio || 1968–1969|| Drama series|| Narciso Ibáñez Serrador
|-
| Préstame tu vida || 2005 || Reality show || Ana García Lozano
|-
| Prêt-à-porter || 1993 || Sitcom || Francisco Morán
|-
| Primer aplauso || 1959–1966 || Talent show|| José Luis Barcelona and Ángel Losada
|-
| Primera fila || 1962–1965 || Theatre ||
|-
| Primera función || 1989 || Theatre ||
|-
| Primera hora || 1974–1975 || Science || Félix Rodríguez de la Fuente
|-
| La Pr1mera pregunta || 2020 || Variety show ||Lluís Guilera
|-
| El Primero de la clase || 2006 || Science || Antonio Hidalgo and Eduardo Punset
|-
| Primero izquierda || 1991–1992 || Interviews || Carlos Herrera
|-
| Proceso a Mariana Pineda || 1984 || Drama series || Pepa Flores
|-
| Prodigios || 2019–2021 || Talent show || Boris Izaguirre
|-
| El Programa de Carlos Herrera || 1997–1998 || Interviews || Carlos Herrera
|-
| Promesas de arena || 2019 || Drama series || Daniel Grao and Blanca Portillo
|-
| Protagonista, el hombre || 1967–1968 || Science || Federico Gallo
|-
| Protagonistas del recuerdo || 2006 || Science ||
|-
| Próximamente || 1982–1983 || Variety show|| Marisa Medina and Isabel Bauzá
|-
| El Pueblo más divertido || 2014 || Game show|| Mariló Montero and Millán Salcedo
|-
| Un Pueblo para Europa  || 1970 || Game show|| Pedro Macía
|-
| Puerta con puerta || 1999 || Sitcom || Juan Luis Galiardo and Sancho Gracia
|-
| La Puerta del misterio || 1982–1984 || Science || Fernando Jiménez del Oso
|-
| Puerta grande || 1970 || Variety show || Alfredo Amestoy
|-
| Puesta a punto || 1983–1985 || Sports || Eva Nasarre
|-
| Punto de encuentro || 1985–1987 || Variety show || Pedro Macía
|-
| Punto de vista || 1963–1966 || News || Manuel Calvo Hernando
|-
| Punto y aparte || 1985–1991 || News || Manuel Campo Vidal
|-
| Pura coincidencia || 1973 || Comedy || Tip y Coll
|-	
| Pura magia|| 2017–2018|| Variety show|| Mag Lari
|-
| ¡Qué animal! || 2017– || Science || Evelyn Segura 
|-
| ¿Qué apostamos? || 1993–2000 || Game show || Ramón García and Ana Obregón
|-
| ¡Qué grande es el cine! || 1995–2005 || Movies || José Luis Garci
|-
| ¡Qué noche la de aquel año! || 1987 || Music || Miguel Ríos
|-
| ¿Qué pintamos aquí? || 1985–1986 || Drama series|| Francisco Rabal
|-
| Qué sabe nadie || 1990 || Interviews || Jesús Quintero
|-
| Que usted lo mate bien || 1979 || Theatre ||
|-
| Que viene Muzzy || 1987 || Children || Juan Antonio Ollero and Izaskun Azurmendi
|-
| Querido cabaret || 1990 || Music || Guillermina Motta
|-
| Querido Pirulí || 1988 || Interviews || Fernando García Tola
|-
| Queridos cómicos || 1992|| Theatre||
|-
| Quién con quién || 1999 || Game show || Jaime Bores
|-
| ¿Quién dice la verdad? || 1965–1966 || Game show || Juan Antonio Fernández Abajo
|-
| Quién educa a quién || 2020 || Talk show || Mamen Asencio
|-
| ¿Quién es quién? || 1963–1965 || Game show || Federico Gallo and Juan Manuel Soriano
|-
| ¿Quién es? || 1976 || Game show || Manuel Calvo Hernando
|-
| ¿Quién manda aquí? || 2014 || Quiz show || Javier Estrada
|-
| Quién sabe dónde || 1992–1998 || Variety show || Francisco Lobatón
|-
| ¿Quién tiene la palabra? || 1963–1964 || Science || Juan Manuel Soriano
|-
| ¡Quiero bailar! || 2008 || Music || Josep Lobató
|-
| El Quijote de Miguel de Cervantes || 1991 || Drama series|| Fernando Rey and Alfredo Landa
|-
| La Quiniela || 1968–1970 || Sports || Santiago Vázquez
|-
| La Quinta esfera || 2003 || Game show || Jorge Fernández
|-
| El Quinto jinete || 1975 || Drama series ||
|-
| Ramón y Cajal || 1982 || Drama series || Adolfo Marsillach
|-
| Raquel busca su sitio || 2000 || Drama series|| Cayetana Guillén Cuervo
|-
| Rasgos || 1982 || Interviews || Mónica Randall
|-
| La Realidad inventada || 1988 || Culture || Paloma Chamorro
|-
| El Recreo || 1977–1978 || Children || Torrebruno and Paula Gardoqui
|-
| Recuerda cuándo || 1987 || Drama series|| Manuel Galiana
|-
| Redacción noche || 1976–1979 || News || Joaquín Arozamena, José Antonio Silva and Santiago López Castillo
|-
| Redes || 1996–2013 || Science || Eduardo Punset
|-
| Refrito || 1981 || Comedy || José Luis Coll
|-
| La Regenta  || 1995 || Drama series || Aitana Sánchez-Gijón
|-
| Régimen abierto || 1986 || Drama series|| Álvaro de Luna, Pilar Velázquez and Silvia Tortosa
|-
| Las Reglas del juego || 1977–1978 || Game show || José Antonio Jáuregui
|-
| Reina por un día || 1964 || Game show || José Luis Barcelona and Mario Cabré
|-
| Remite: Maribel || 1970 || Sitcom || Tina Sáinz
|-
| Repor || 2007- || Documentary ||
|-
| Los Reporteros || 1974–1976 || Documentary || Javier Basilio, Diego Carcedo and Jesús González Green
|-
| Réquiem por Granada || 1991 || Drama series|| Manuel Bandera
|-
| El Retorno de Omaita || 2003 || Comedy || Los Morancos
|-
| Retrato en vivo || 1979–1982 || Interviews || Miguel de los Santos
|-
| Retratos con alma || 2018 || Interviews || Isabel Gemio
|-
| Revista de cine || 1974–1981 || Movies || Alfonso Eduardo
|-
| Revista de toros || 1971–1983 || Bullfighting || Mariví Romero
|-
| Revista para la mujer || 1963–1967 || Variety show || Maruja Fernández, María del Carmen Goñi and Pedro Macía
|-
| Revistero || 1975–1976 || Variety show || Tico Medina, Isabel Tenaille and Jana Escribano
|-
| El Rey de la comedia  || 2007 || Comedy || Eduard Soto and Esther Arroyo
|-
| Rimas populares || 1969–1970 || Variety show || Antolín García
|-
| La Risa española || 1969 || Theatre || 
|-
| Risas y estrellas || 1997–1999 || Variety show || Paloma Lago, José Luis Moreno and Loreto Valverde
|-
| Ritmo 70 || 1970 || Music || José María Íñigo and Pepe Palau
|-
| Ritmo || 1962–1960 || Music || Carmina Alonso
|-
| El Rival más débil || 2002–2004 || Game show || Nuria González and Karmele Aranburu
|-
| Robles, investigador || 2000 || Drama series|| Antonio Resines
|-
| Rockambole || 1989 || Music || El Gran Wyoming
|-
| Rockopop || 1988–1992 || Music || Beatriz Pécker
|-
| Rompecocos || 1996–1997 || Game show || Paco Vegara
|-
| Ronda de España || 1963–1964 || Music || Antoñita Moreno
|-
| La Ronda || 1991 || Interviews|| Julia Otero
|-
| El Rondo || 2005–2007 || Sports|| Juan Carlos Rivero, Quique Guash and Lourdes García Campos
|-
| Rosi y los demás || 1963 || Sitcom|| Félix Navarro
|-
| RTVE responde || 2008- || Variety show || Elena Sánchez
|-
| Rueda de prensa || 1965–1966 || Interviews || Victoriano Fernández de Asís
|-
| Ruffus & Navarro Unplugged || 2005–2006 || Late night || Pepe Navarro
|-
| Ruralitas || 2020– || Documentary || 
|-
| Ruta Quetzal || 1993- || Children || Miguel de la Quadra-Salcedo
|-
| Rutas bizarras || 2021– || Travel || Marta Hazas and Xosé Antonio Touriñán
|-
| Sabadabada || 1981–1983 || Children || Torrebruno, Mayra Gómez Kemp and Sonia Martínez
|-
| El Sábado || 2005 || Variety show || Minerva Piquero
|-
| Sábado 64 || 1964–1965 || Variety show|| Clara Isabel Francia and Carmina Alonso
|-
| Sábado cine || 1977 || Movies || Manuel Martín Ferrand
|-
| Sábado noche || 1987–1989 || Variety show || Toni Cantó, Carlos Herrera and Bibiana Fernández
|-
| Sábado noche || 2006 || Variety show || Josema Yuste and Nani Gaitán
|-
| Sábado revista || 1989–1990 || Variety show || Manuel Almendros and María San Juan
|-
| Saber vivir || 1997–2009 || Science || Manuel Torreiglesias
|-
| Saber y Ganar || 1997- || Game show || Jordi Hurtado
|-
| Los Sabios  || 1984–1986 || Children || Andrés Caparrós, Isabel Gemio and Miguel Ángel Jenner
|-
| Sabuesos || 2018 || Drama Series|| Salva Reina
|-
| Sacalalengua || 2009 || Variety show || Ana Solanes
|-
| La saga de los Rius || 1976–1977 || Drama series || Fernando Guillén
|-
| El Salero || 1990–1991 || Music || José Manuel Parada and Trinidad Iglesias
|-
| Salto a la fama || 1963–1965 || Talent show || José Luis Barcelona and José Luis Uribarri
|-
| Sánchez y Carbonell || 2020 || Talk show || Elena S. Sánchez and Pablo Carbonell
|-
| Sandino || 1994 || Drama series|| Joaquim de Almeida
|-
| Sara y Punto || 1990 || Variety show || Sara Montiel
|-
| Se hace saber || 2014 || Comedy || Goyo Jiménez
|-
| ¿Se puede? || 2004 || Sitcom || Lina Morgan
|-
| El Secreto || 2001 || Telenovela|| Lorena Bernal
|-
| El Secreto de la porcelana || 1999 || Drama series|| Eusebio Poncela
|-
| Secretos de familia || 1994 || Variety show || Ángeles Martín and Paula Vázquez
|-
| Secuencia || 1966 || Science || Luis Pruneda
|-
| La Segunda cadena informa || 1968 || News || Rosa María Mateo
|-
| Segunda enseñanza || 1986 || Drama series || Ana Diosdado
|-
| La Segunda oportunidad || 1978–1979 || Science || Paco Costas
|-
| Segundos fuera || 1986 || Comedy || Ignacio Salas and Guillermo Summers
|-
| Seguridad vital || 2015–2018 || Science || Marta Solano and Carlos García Hirschfeld
|-
| Seis hermanas || 2015–2017 || Soap opera || María Castro
|-
| El Semáforo  || 1995–1999 || Comedy || Jordi Estadella and Asunción Embuena
|-
| La Semana  || 1974–1978 || Children || Francisco García Novell and Carmen Lázaro
|-
| La Semana que viene || 1970–1971 || Variety show || José Luis Uribarri
|-
| El Seneca || 1967–1970 || Drama series|| Antonio Martelo
|-
| El Señor Villanueva y su gente  || 1979 || Sitcom || Ismael Merlo and Lola Herrera
|-
| La Señora || 2008 || Drama series || Rodolfo Sancho
|-
| La Señora García se confiesa  || 1976–1977 || Drama || Lucía Bosé and Adolfo Marsillach
|-
| ¡Señoras y señores! || 1973–1976|| Variety show || Valerio Lazarov, Norma Duval, Ángela Carrasco, Fiorella Faltoyano
|-
| El Séptimo cielo || 1989 || Drama series|| Mónica Randall
|-
| El Séptimo de caballería || 1998–1999 || Music || Miguel Bosé
|-
 | Sequía  ||2022 || Drama Series || Elena Rivera.
|-	
| Servir y proteger || 2017– || Drama series || Luisa Martín
|-
| El Sexólogo || 1994 || Sitcom || Antonio Ozores
|-
| El Show de Flo || 2002–2003 || Comedy || Florentino Fernández
|-
| El Show de La Primera || 1992–1993 || Variety show || Fernando Carrillo, Kim Manning and Concha Galán
|-
| Si las piedras hablaran || 1972–1973 || Science || Natalia Figueroa
|-
| Si lo sé no vengo || 1985–1988 || Game show || Jordi Hurtado
|-
| Sí o no || 1961–1963 || Game show || Joaquín Soler Serrano
|-
| Si yo fuera presidente || 1983–1985 || Interviews || Fernando García Tola
|-
| Si yo fuera rico || 1973–1974 || Sitcom || Antonio Garisa
|-
| Siempre en domingo || 1971–1972 || Variety show || Joaquín Prat, José Luis Uribarri and Juan Antonio Fernández Abajo
|-
| Sierra, mar... o nada || 1958 || Variety show || Tico Medina
|-
| Siete días || 1974–1981 || News || José Antonio Silva, Jesús Álvarez and Isabel Tenaille
|-
| Siete piezas cortas || 1972 || Theatre ||
|-
| Las Siete y media musical || 1973 || Music || Luis del Olmo
|-
| Silencio, estrenamos || 1974 || Sitcom || Adolfo Marsillach and Amparo Baró
|-
| Silencio se juega || 1984 || Game show || El Gran Wyoming and Paula Gardoqui
|-
| Silencio, vivimos || 1962–1963 || Sitcom || Adolfo Marsillach
|-
| Silencio, se rueda || 1961–1962 || Sitcom || Adolfo Marsillach
|-
| Sin fronteras || 1980-1981 || Talk Show || Joaquín Soler Serrano
|-
| Sin vergüenza || 1992–1993 || Game show || Ángeles Martín
|-
| Sincronizados || 2013 || Documentary || 
|-
| Sobre la marcha || 1971–1972 || Sports|| Julio César Fernández
|-
| Sólo goles || 1994–1997 || Sports || Matías Prats Luque
|-
| Solo moda || 2012– || Variety show || Nieves Álvarez
|-
| Sólo para hombres || 1963 || Variety show || Ana María Solsona
|-
| La Solución... mañana || 1970 || Variety show|| Alfredo Amestoy
|-
| La sonata del silencio || 2016 || Drama Series || Eduardo Noriega
|-
| Sonatas || 1983|| Drama series || Fernando Méndez-Leite
|-
| Sonría, por favor || 1963–1965 || Comedy || Pepe Palau, José Luis Coll and Chumy Chúmez
|-
| Sopa de gansos || 1989–1991 || Children|| Rosa León
|-
| Sospecha || 1963–1971 || Drama series||
|-
| Splunge || 2005 || Comedy || Florentino Fernández, Eva Hache and Patricia Conde
|-
| Stamos okupa2 || 2012 || Sitcom || Carmen Maura
|-
| Stop || 1972 || Science || Manuel Gil
|-
| Su turno || 1981–1983 || Talk show || Jesús Hermida
|-
| Subasta de triunfos || 1971–1974 || Sports|| Daniel Vindel and Antolín García
|-
| Suena la copla || 1996 || Music || Francisco Valladares
|-
| Sumarísimo || 1978–1979 || Comedy || Manuel Codeso and Alfonso del Real
|-
| Las Supersabias || 1972 || Game show || Torrebruno
|-
| Superstar || 1984 || Variety show || Norma Duval
|-
| El Supertren || 1991 || Comedy || Elisa Matilla
|-
| Suspiros de España || 1974–1975 || Drama series || Antonio Ferrandis and Irene Gutiérrez Caba
|-
| T con T || 2014 || Talk show || Toñi Moreno
|-
| Tablón de anuncios || 1984–1986 || Culture || Sonia Grande
|-
| Tal como éramos || 1998 || Variety show || Jaime Bores
|-
| Tal como somos || 1996 || Interviews || Àngel Casas
|-
| Tal cual || 1988–1989 || Interviews || Manuel Hidalgo
|-
| Tal cual || 1992–1996 || Interviews || Àngel Casas
|-
| Tal para cual || 1965 || Comedy || Zori y Santos
|-
| Taller Mecánico || 1991–1992 || Sitcom || Antonio Ozores
|-
| Tan a gustito || 2005–2006 || Comedy || Alfonso Arús
|-
| Tango || 1991 || Drama series || Javier Bardem
|-
| Tarde de teatro || 1986 || Theatre ||
|-
| Tarde para todos || 1972–1974 || Variety show|| Juan Antonio Fernández Abajo, Clara Isabel Francia and Yolanda Ríos
|-
| La Tarde  || 1983–1989 || Variety show || Pepe Navarro, María Casanova and Andrés Aberasturi
|-
| Tardes de Primera || 1996 || Variety show || Ramón García and Concha Galán
|-
| Tariro, Tariro || 1988–1989 || Comedy || La Trinca
|-
| Tarjeta de visita || 1964–1965 || Variety show || Juan Manuel Soriano, Mario Beut and Federico Gallo
|-
| Te ha tocado || 2022|| Quiz Show || Raúl Gómez
|-
| El Teatro || 1974 || Theatre ||
|-
| Teatro Apolo || 1958–1960|| Theatre || Fernando García de la Vega
|-
| Teatro breve || 1966–1981 || Theatre ||
|-
| Teatro Club || 1976–1978 || Theatre ||
|-
| Teatro de familia || 1959–1965 || Theatre ||
|-
| Teatro de humor || 1964–1965 || Theatre ||
|-
| Teatro de la TVE || 1957–1958 || Theatre ||
|-
| Teatro de misterio || 1970 || Theatre ||
|-
| Teatro de siempre || 1966–1972 || Theatre ||
|-
| Teatro estudio || 1977–1981 || Theatre ||
|-
| Teatro para todos || 1965 || Theatre ||
|-
| La Tele de tu vida  || 2007 || Videos || Jesús Hermida
|-
| Tele-club|| 1964–1966 || Variety show || Antolín García, Pilar Cañada
|-
| Tele-club || 1968–1970 || Variety show|| Alfredo Amestoy
|-
| Tele-Madrid || 1957 || Variety show || Tico Medina and Yale
|-
| Tele-Revista || 1974–1975 || Variety show || Teresa Gimpera, Mónica Randall and Florencio Solchaga
|-
| Los Tele-Rodríguez || 1957–1958 || Sitcom|| María Fernanda D'Ocón
|-
| Telecomedia de humor || 1966–1971 || Theatre ||
|-
| Telecomedia || 1974–1975 || Theatre ||
|-
| Telediario || 1957- || News || Jesús Álvarez, Ana Blanco, Luis Mariñas,Rosa María Mateo, Lorenzo Milá
|-
| Teledomingo || 1963–1965 || Variety show || Joaquín Díaz-Palacios
|-
| Telepasión española || 1990–2003 || Variety show ||
|-
| Un Tema para el debate || 1965–1968|| Talk show ||Pilar Miró
|-
| Temas || 1974 || Variety show || Ricardo Fernández Deu
|-
| Tendido 13 || 1966 || Bullfighting || Manuel Lozano Sevilla
|-
| Tendido cero || 1986 || Bullfighting || Fernando Fernández Román
|-
| Tenemos que hablar || 2013 || Talk show || Ana García Lozano
|-
| Tengo once años || 2014 || Science || 
|-
| Tengo un libro en las manos || 1959–1966 || Science|| Luis de Sosa
|-
| Tengo una pregunta para usted || 2007–2011 || Interviews || Lorenzo Milá and Ana Blanco
|-
| Las Tentaciones || 1970–1971 || Drama series ||
|-
| Tercer grado || 1963 || Interviews || Tico Medina
|-
| El Tercer grado || 1997–2004 || Interviews || Isabel San Sebastián and Carlos Dávila
|-
| El Tercer rombo || 1966 || Drama series || María Fernanda D'Ocón
|-
| Tercera planta, inspección fiscal || 1991 || Sitcom || José Sazatornil
|-
| Tercero izquierda || 1963 || Sitcom || Elvira Quintillá and José Luis López Vázquez
|-
| Teresa de Jesús || 1984 || Drama series|| Concha Velasco
|-
| Tertulia con || 1981 || Talk show || Fernando Fernán Gómez
|-
| Testigo directo || 1994–1999 || News || Ramón Pellicer
|-
| La Tía de Ambrosio || 1971 || Sitcom || Rafaela Aparicio and Luis Morris
|-
| Tiempo al tiempo || 2001–2002 || Variety show || Concha Velasco
|-
| Tiempo de magia || 1976 || Variety show || Julio Carabias
|-
| El Tiempo en que vivimos  || 1989–1990 || Variety show || Inma de Santis
|-
| El tiempo es oro || 1987–1992 || Game show || Constantino Romero
|-
| Tiempo libre || 1978–1979 || Variety show || Aurora Claramunt
|-
| Tiempo y hora || 1965 || Sitcom || Antonio Ferrandis and Amparo Baró
|-
| La Tierra de las 1000 músicas || 2005 || Music || Joaquín Luqui
|-
| Tío Willy || 1998–1999 || Sitcom || Andrés Pajares
|-
| Tips || 2016–2017 || Variety Show|| Ruth Jiménez
|-
| Tocao del ala || 1997 || Sitcom || Ferran Rañé
|-
| Tocata || 1983–1987 || Music || José Antonio Abellán
|-
| Todo en familia || 1999–2001 || Game show || Ramón García
|-
| Todo es posible en domingo || 1974 || Variety show || Juan Antonio Fernández Abajo, Kiko Ledgard and Tico Medina
|-
| Todo motor || 1989 || Sports|| Jesús Álvarez Cervantes
|-
| Todo queda en casa || 1986–1987 || Game show || Pedro Osinaga
|-
| Todo/Fórmula Todo || 1969–1972 || Variety show|| Jesús Álvarez and Blanca Gala
|-
| Todos los deportes || 1962–1963 || Sports|| Miguel Ors
|-
| Todos somos jóvenes || 1968 || Children || Patricia Nigel
|-
| Todos somos raros, todos somos únicos || 2014 || Public service || Isabel Gemio
|-
| Torneo || 1976–1979 || Sports || Daniel Vindel
|-
| Torres en la cocina || 2015–2019 || Cooking show|| Torres Brothers
|-
| Torres y Reyes || 2013 || Variety || Mara Torres and Joaquín Reyes
|-
| La Tortuga perezosa  || 1961–1968 || Comedy || José Luis Coll and 
|-
| TPH Club || 1999–2003 || Children || Paloma Lago
|-
| Trabajo temporal || 2016– || Reality show || 
|-
| Tragedias de la vida vulgar || 1964–1965 || Sitcom|| José Luis Ozores and Antonio Ozores
|-
| Traición  || 2017–2018 || Drama Series || Ana Belén
|-
| La Transición || 1995 || Documentary || Victoria Prego
|-
| El Tranvía del humor || 1957–1958 || Comedy || Chumy Chúmez and Álvaro de la Iglesia
|-
| Tras la puerta cerrada || 1963–1965 || Drama series||
|-
| Trazos || 1977 || Culture|| Paloma Chamorro
|-
| El Tren || 1982–1983 || Variety show || Mary Carmen
|-
| Tres eran tres || 1972–1973 || Sitcom || Amparo Soler Leal, Julieta Serrano and Emma Cohen
|-
| Los Tres mosqueteros || 1971 || Drama series|| Sancho Gracia
|-
 | Tres puertas, Las || 2022- || Talk Show || María Casado.
|-
| Tribuna internacional || 1979–1980 || News || Jesús Hermida
|-
| Tribuna TV || 1967–1968 || News || Victoriano Fernández de Asís
|-
| Tribunal popular || 1989–1991 || Talk show|| Xavier Foz, Javier Nart and Ricardo Fernández Deu
|-
| Trilocos || 1999 || Children || Miliki
|-
| Tristeza de amor || 1986 || Drama series || Alfredo Landa and Concha Cuetos
|-
| Triunfomanía || 2002 || Music || Carlos Lozano
|-
| Tu oportunidad || 2013–2014 || Reality show || Juanjo Pardo
|-
| Tú tranquilo || 1965 || Sitcom|| Antonio Garisa
|-
| Turno de oficio || 1986–1987 || Drama series|| Juan Luis Galiardo and Juan Echanove
|-
| Turno de oficio: Diez años después || 1996 || Drama series || Juan Luis Galiardo and Juan Echanove
|-
| TVE es noticia || 1966 || Variety show || José Luis Uribarri and Pilar Cañada
|-
| TVEmos || 2015–2021 || Videos || Elisa Mouliaá
|-
| Typical Spanish || 2020 || Game Show|| Frank Blanco
|-
| U.C.O. || 2009 || Drama series|| Miguel Ángel Solá
|-
| Última frontera || 1983–1984 || Science || Manuel Toharia
|-
| Última hora || 1977 || News|| Pedro Macía
|-
| La Última moda  || 1969 || Variety show || Soledad Miranda
|-
| Últimas preguntas || 1982- || News || María Casanova
|-
| El Último café || 1970–1972 || Sitcom|| Antonio Garisa, Valeriano Andrés and Tip y Coll
|-
| Último Grito || 1968 || Music|| José María Íñigo and Judy Stephen
|-
| Un encargo original || 1983 || Theatre ||
|-
| Un, dos, tres... responda otra vez || 1972–2004|| Game show || Narciso Ibáñez Serrador, Kiko Ledgard, Mayra Gómez-Kemp,Jordi Estadella, Miriam Díaz Aroca, Luis Roderas
|-
| Una de dos || 1998–1999 || Sitcom|| Lina Morgan
|-
| Una de tres || 1994 || Sitcom || Luis Fernando Alvés
|-
| La Unión hace la fuerza  || 1964–1966 || Game show|| Mario Beut and Alberto Oliveras
|-
| Uno de los nuestros || 2013 || Talent show || Carlos Latre
|-
| Los Unos y los otros || 1994–1995 || Interviews || Àngel Casas
|-
| Usted, por ejemplo || 1982–1984 || Science || Manuel Torreiglesias
|-
| Vamos a la mesa || 1967–1968 || Cooking show|| Maruja Callaved
|-
| Vamos a ver || 1981–1982 || Variety show || Julio César Fernández, Marisa Medina and Isabel Borondo
|-
| Vaya crack || 2019|| Game show|| Roberto Leal
|-
| Vaya lío || 1997 || Variety show|| Concha Galán
|-
| ¡Vaya peña! || 2001 || Variety show|| Carlos Lozano
|-
| Vaya tele || 1994 || Comedy || Cruz y Raya
|-
| Veraneantes || 1984 || Drama series|| María Luisa San José, Ana María Vidal, Elisa Ramírez
|-
| Verano 8'30 pm magazine || 1986 || Variety show|| Ana María Molano
|-
| Verano azul || 1981 || Drama series|| Antonio Ferrandis and María Garralón
|-
| El Verano de tu vida || 2005 || Variety show|| Jorge Fernández
|-
| El Verano ya llegó || 2004 || Variety show || Paloma Lago and Miguel Ángel Tobías
|-
| Verbena || 1965 || Variety show|| Mario Beut
|-
| La Verdad de las cosas || 1965 || Science || César González Ruano
|-
| La Verdad de Laura || 2002 || Soap opera || Mónica Estarreado
|-
| La Verdad de... || 1979 || Variety show|| Alfredo Amestoy
|-
| Verdad o mentira || 1982–1983 || Game show || Alberto Oliveras
|-
| Versión española || 1998- || Movies || Cayetana Guillén Cuervo
|-
| Vértigo || 1999 || Comedy|| Antonio Resines and Miriam Díaz Aroca
|-
| Viaje al centro de la tele || 2013– || Videos || Manu Martínez
|-
| Viaje con nosotros || 1988 || Interviews || Javier Gurruchaga
|-
| Viajes alrededor de una pareja || 1970 || Sitcom|| María José Alfonso and Pedro Osinaga
|-
| Vicente Ferrer || 2014 || Drama|| Imanol Arias and Aída Folch
|-
| Víctor Ros || 2015 || Drama series || Carles Francino
|-
| La Vida || 1967 || Variety show || Alfredo Amestoy
|-
| La Vida de Rita || 2003 || Sitcom|| Verónica Forqué
|-
| La Vida en el aire || 1998 || Drama series || Fiorella Faltoyano
|-
| La Vida es juego || 1992–1993 || Game show|| Constantino Romero
|-
| Vida salvaje || 1970 || Science || Félix Rodríguez de la Fuente
|-
| La Vida según... || 1995 || News|| Ana Cristina Navarro
|-
| La Vida sigue  || 1988 || Variety show|| Joaquín Arozamena
|-
| Vídeos de primera || 1990–1998 || Videos || Alfonso Arús, Bermúdez and Alonso Caparrós
|-
| Viento, madera y barro || 1984 || Science|| Miguel de los Santos
|-
| Villa Rosaura || 1994 || Sitcom || Rosa María Sardà
|-
| Villarriba y Villabajo || 1994 || Sitcom|| Juanjo Puigcorbé and Ana Duato
|-
| La Virtud del asesino || 1998 || Drama series|| Sancho Gracia
|-
| Visado para el futuro || 1963–1965 || Science|| Luis Miravitlles
|-
| La Víspera de nuestro tiempo  || 1981–1984 || Science|| José Antonio Silva and Cristina García Ramos
|-
| Vísperas || 1987 || Drama series|| Rafael Álvarez
|-
| Visto para sentencia || 1971 || Drama series || Javier Escrivá
|-
| Visto y no visto || 1982 || Variety show|| Alfredo Amestoy
|-
| Visto y oído || 1972 || Variety show || Mario Beut
|-
| Las Viudas  || 1977 || Drama series || Lola Herrera
|-
| Viva el espectáculo || 1990–1991 || Variety show || Concha Velasco
|-
| Viva la ciencia || 1990 || Science || Manuel Toharia
|-
| Vivan los bares || 2014 || Cooking|| Lorena Castell and Juan Makandé
|-
| Vive el verano || 1999 || Variety show || Pedro Rollán
|-
| Vivir cada día || 1978–1988 ||Docudrama || José Luis Rodríguez Puértolas
|-
| Vivir es lo que importa || 1971 || Variety show|| Antonio Fraguas and Manuel Summers
|-
| Vivir para ver || 1969 || Variety show ||
|-
| Vivir para ver || 1975–1977 || Variety show || Alfredo Amestoy
|-
| Voces a 45 || 1975–1976 || Music || Pepe Domingo Castaño
|-
| Voces de oro || 1970–1971 || Music|| Miguel de los Santos
|-
| Voces sin voz || 1981–1982 || Science || Manuel Torreiglesias
|-
| Voluntarios || 2004 || Variety show || Francine Gálvez
|-
| La Voz humana || 1986–1988 || Music ||
|-
| La Vuelta al mundo de Willy Fog || 1984 || Children ||
|-
| Vuestro amigo Quique || 1972–1973 || Children|| Herta Frankel
|-
| Waku waku || 1989–1991, 1998–2000 || Game show|| Consuelo Berlanga and Nuria Roca
|-
| X-O da dinero || 1959 || Game show|| Juan Viñas and Estanis González
|-
| Xat.TV || 2000 || Science || Leticia Dolera
|-
| Y al final esperanza || 1967 || Theatre ||
|-
| ¿Y ahora qué...? || 2009–2010 || Comedy|| Josema Yuste and Florentino Fernández
|-
| ¿Y quién es él? || 1994 || Variety show|| Mari Pau Domínguez
|-
| ...Y siete || 1971 || Science || Victoriano Fernández de Asís
|-
| Y sin embargo, te quiero || 1983–1985 || Variety show|| Ignacio Salas and Guillermo Summers
|-
| Ya semos europeos || 1989 || Comedy || Albert Boadella
|-
| Ya sé que tienes novio || 1985 || Game show|| Constantino Romero
|-
| Ya te vale || 2008 || Children || Gemma Nierga
|-
| Yo canto || 1977–1978 || Music||
|-
| Yo de mayor quier ser español || 2011 || Comedy || Gomaespuma
|-
| Yo estuve allí || 2008 || Variety show|| Carolina Ferre
|-
| Yo mono || 2015 || Science || Pablo Herreros
|-
| Yo robo, tú chantajeas, ella estafa y además un muerto || 1984 || Sitcom|| Emilio Gutiérrez Caba
|-
| Zip zap || 1997 || Variety show|| Belén Rueda
|-
| Zona de juego || 1993 || Game show || Miguel Ortiz
|-
| Zona franca || 1995–1996 || Music|| Arancha de Benito and Tony Aguilar
|}

 References 

 External links 
 Historia de TVE. Coleccionable. Diario Ya, 1986.
 Historia de Televisión Española. Francisco José López Fernández, Universidad Complutense de Madrid, 2006.

 Bibliography 
 Díaz, Lorenzo. 50 años de TVE, 2008. Alianza Editorial. 
 España, Ramón de. La caja de las sorpresas. 2001. Editorial Planeta. 
 Palacio, Manuel. La televisión durante la Transición española. 2012. Editorial Cátedra. 
 Sempere Bernal, Antonio. Locos por la tele 2005. 
 Valenzuela, Javier. Usted puede ser tertuliano'' 2011. Ediciones Península. 

TVE
TVE